= NFKBID =

Protein-coding gene in the species Homo sapiens

Identifiers
- Aliases: NFKBID, IkappaBNS, TA-NFKBH, NFKB inhibitor delta, IkBNS
- External IDs: MGI: 3041243; GeneCards: NFKBID

Gene location (Human)
Chr.	Chromosome 19 (human)
Band	19q13.12	Start	35,887,653 bp
Band	19q13.12	End	35,902,303 bp

Gene location (Mouse)
Chr.	Chromosome 7 (mouse)
Band	7|7 B1	Start	30,121,157 bp
Band	7|7 B1	End	30,128,171 bp
RNA expression pattern
Bgee	Human / Mouse (ortholog); Top expressed in: bone marrow cell; granulocyte; sural nerve; monocyte; blood; appendix; mucosa of ileum; spleen; upper lobe of left lung; left lobe of thyroid gland / Top expressed in: granulocyte; mesenteric lymph nodes; thymus; spleen; bone marrow; stroma of bone marrow; blood; embryo; embryo; subcutaneous adipose tissue; More reference expression data
BioGPS	n/a
Gene ontology
Molecular function	protein binding; transcription coregulator activity; NF-kappaB binding
Cellular component	nucleus
Biological process	regulation of transcription by RNA polymerase II; negative regulation of T cell differentiation in thymus; positive regulation of thymocyte apoptotic process; inflammatory response; negative regulation of NF-kappaB transcription factor activity; negative regulation of I-kappaB kinase/NF-kappaB signaling; T cell receptor signaling pathway; positive regulation of T-helper 17 cell differentiation
Sources:Amigo / QuickGO
Orthologs
Databases	NCBI: entry; OMA: entry
Species	Human	Mouse
Entrez	84807	243910
Ensembl	ENSG00000167604	ENSMUSG00000036931
UniProt	Q8NI38	Q2TB02
RefSeq (mRNA)	NM_139239; NM_001321831; NM_001365705; NM_001365706; NM_032721	NM_172142; NM_001360906; NM_001360907
RefSeq (protein)	NP_001308760; NP_640332; NP_001352634; NP_001352635; NP_116110	NP_742154; NP_001347835; NP_001347836
Location (UCSC)	Chr 19: 35.89 – 35.9 Mb	Chr 7: 30.12 – 30.13 Mb
PubMed search
- Wikidata
View/Edit Human	View/Edit Mouse

Nuclear factor of kappa light polypeptide gene enhancer in B-cells inhibitor, delta also known as IκBNS is a protein in humans that is encoded by the NFKBID gene.

IκBNS is a member of the atypical inhibitors of NF-κB (also called the nuclear IκBs). NF-κB is a transcription factor, which regulates the expression of its target genes, depending on intracellular and extracellular signals. As NFKBID influences the impact of NF-κB on several genes, it is involved in cellular responses to stimuli such as stress and bacterial or viral antigens.

== Structure ==
NFKBID is a nuclear protein with 327 amino acids. It contains six ankyrin repeats (ANKs), that are surrounded by a nuclear localization signal sequence (NLS) at the N-terminus and a short C-terminus. The ANKs are characteristic for all IκB proteins. The NLS is an additional characteristic structural element of only atypical IκB proteins, which is responsible for the localization of the protein into the nucleus. In contrast, classical inhibitors, e.g. IκBα and IκBβ, are located in the cytoplasm. A high resolution structure of NFKBID is not available yet.

Scheme of NFKBID. It consists of six ankyrin domains (ANK – blue) and a nuclear localization signal sequence (NLS – green).

== Function ==
It seems that NFKBID acts as an inhibitor of the NF-κB cascade. By its functions, including promotion of germinal center reactions and its requirement in immunosuppressive regulatory T cell generation, NFKBID regulates homeostasis of the immune system and has further different consequences on it. Furthermore, NFKBID influences B cells and plasma cells substantially, concerning their functions and development.

The expression of NFKBID is precisely regulated. After NF-κB activation atypical IκBs are induced by the transcription factor Atypical IκBs, in turn, can regulate the NF-κB transcription as either inducers or inhibitors. In contrast, the classical proteins can only repress NF-κB transcription. In mature T cells (CD4+), T cell receptor (TCR) stimulation can induce the expression of NFKBID, whereas in macrophages, TLR ligands take on this task.

To influence the transcription of genes, NFKBID has some interaction protein partners. It was reported that NFKBID interacts with p50, which is a subunit of NF-κB, p52, p65, RelB, and c-Rel. NFKBID binds these proteins only in the nucleus, except for p50, which can be bound both in the cytoplasm and in the nucleus Researchers suggest that apart from this, NFKBID can also interact with homo- and heterodimers consisting of some of these subunits, e.g. p50/p50 and p65/p50. Depending on the target gene and on which protein is bound by NFKBID, it can function as both repressor and activator.

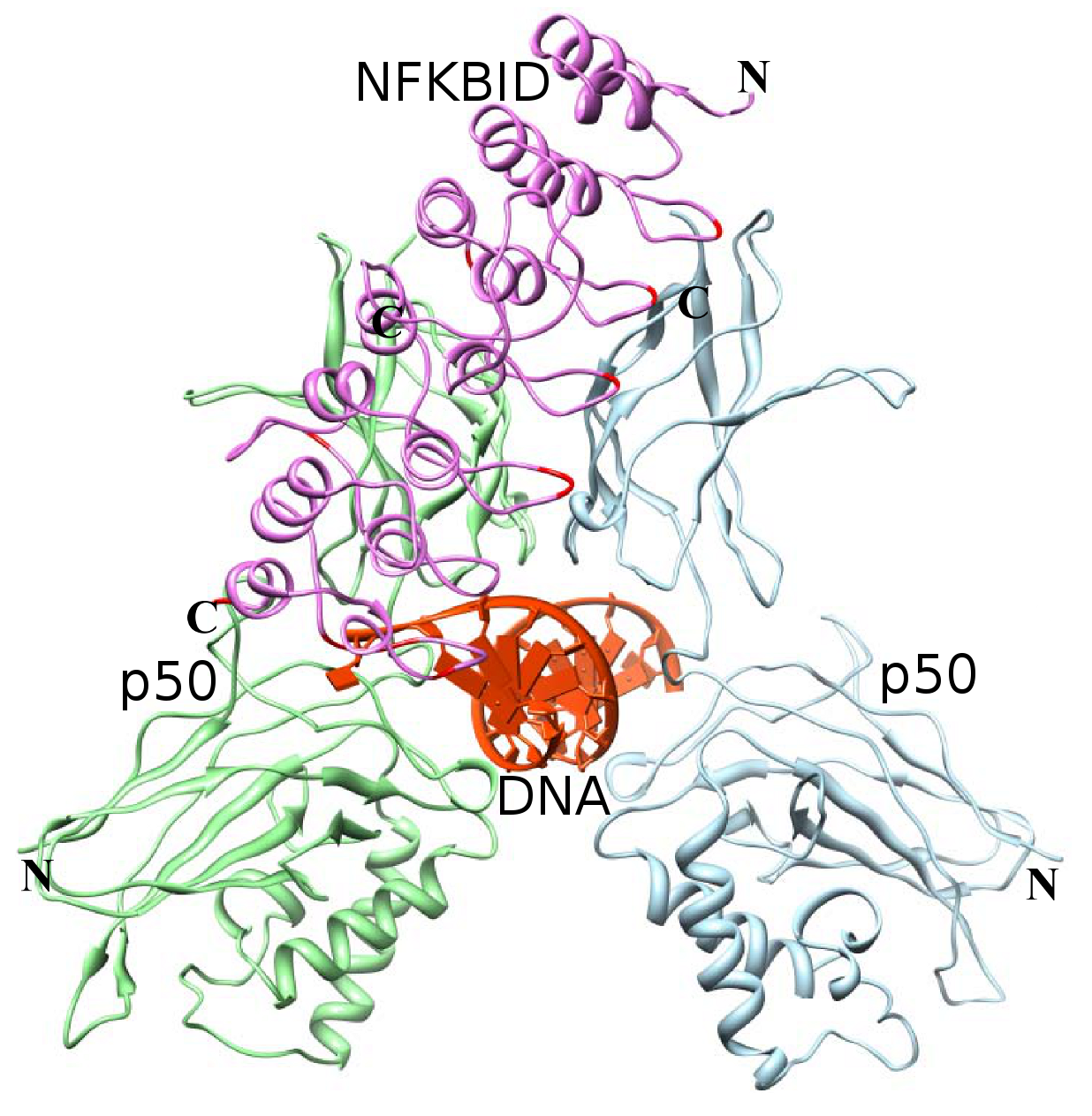
Interaction model of NFKBID (purple) with the p50 homodimer (green and blue) bound to DNA (red). The complex was studied by molecular docking experiments. The NFKBID-p50/p50 complex interacts electrostatically with phosphates of the DNA backbone. Therefore, the protein complex is not able to exit the nucleus. The mainly positively charged surface of NFKBID close to DNA blocks the exchange of the p50/p50 dimer with other dimers, that are activating transcription factors.
