= NFKBIE =

Protein-coding gene in the species Homo sapiens

Identifiers
- Aliases: NFKBIE, IKBE, NFKB inhibitor epsilon
- External IDs: OMIM: 604548; MGI: 1194908; GeneCards: NFKBIE

Gene location (Human)
Chr.	Chromosome 6 (human)
Band	6p21.1	Start	44,258,166 bp
Band	6p21.1	End	44,265,788 bp

Gene location (Mouse)
Chr.	Chromosome 17 (mouse)
Band	17|17 B3	Start	45,866,629 bp
Band	17|17 B3	End	45,874,095 bp
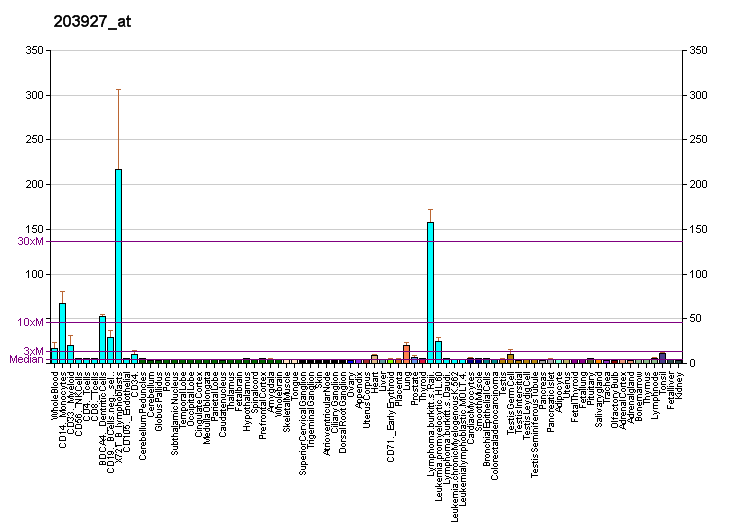
RNA expression pattern
Bgee	Human / Mouse (ortholog); Top expressed in: gonad; granulocyte; spleen; monocyte; cartilage tissue; appendix; bone marrow cell; lymph node; testicle; blood / Top expressed in: mesenteric lymph nodes; spleen; lumbar spinal ganglion; granulocyte; otic vesicle; thymus; subcutaneous adipose tissue; blood; saccule; condyle; More reference expression data
BioGPS	More reference expression data
Gene ontology
Molecular function	protein binding
Cellular component	cytoplasm; perinuclear region of cytoplasm; Golgi apparatus; fibrillar center; nucleus; cytosol
Biological process	cytoplasmic sequestering of transcription factor; D-serine transport
Sources:Amigo / QuickGO
Orthologs
Databases	NCBI: entry; OMA: entry
Species	Human	Mouse
Entrez	4794	18037
Ensembl	ENSG00000146232	ENSMUSG00000023947
UniProt	O00221	O54910
RefSeq (mRNA)	NM_004556	NM_008690; NM_001304956
RefSeq (protein)	NP_004547	NP_001291885; NP_032716
Location (UCSC)	Chr 6: 44.26 – 44.27 Mb	Chr 17: 45.87 – 45.87 Mb
PubMed search
- Wikidata
View/Edit Human	View/Edit Mouse

Nuclear factor of kappa light polypeptide gene enhancer in B-cells inhibitor, epsilon, also known as NFKBIE, is a protein which in humans is encoded by the NFKBIE gene.

== Function ==
NFKBIE protein expression is up-regulated following NF-κB activation and during myelopoiesis. NFKBIE is able to inhibit NF-κB-directed transactivation via cytoplasmic retention of REL proteins.

NFKB1 or NFKB2 is bound to REL, RELA, or RELB to form the NF-κB transcription factor complex. The NF-κB complex is inhibited by I-kappa-B proteins (NFKBIA or NFKBIB), which inactivate NF-kappa-B by trapping it in the cytoplasm. Phosphorylation of serine residues on the I-kappa-B proteins by kinases (IKBKA, or IKBKB) marks them for destruction via the ubiquitination pathway, thereby allowing activation of the NF-kappa-B complex. Activated NF-κB complex translocates into the nucleus and binds DNA at kappa-B-binding motifs such as 5-prime GGGRNNYYCC 3-prime or 5-prime HGGARNYYCC 3-prime (where H is A, C, or T; R is an A or G purine; and Y is a C or T pyrimidine). For some genes, activation requires NF-κB interaction with other transcription factors, such as STAT (see STAT6), AP-1 (JUN), and NFAT (see NFATC1).

== Interactions ==
NFKBIE has been shown to interact with NFKB2, RELA, NFKB1 and REL.
