= MAP3K8 =

Protein-coding gene in the species Homo sapiens

Identifiers
- Aliases: MAP3K8, COT, EST, ESTF, MEKK8, TPL2, Tpl-2, c-COT, AURA2, mitogen-activated protein kinase kinase kinase 8, Tpl2
- External IDs: OMIM: 191195; MGI: 1346878; GeneCards: MAP3K8
Available structures
PDB	Ortholog search: PDBe RCSB
PDB	List of PDB id codes 4Y83, 4Y85
Enzyme activity
EC #	BRENDA	ExPASy	KEGG	MetaCyc
2.7.11.25	↗	↗	↗	↗

Gene location (Human)
Chr.	Chromosome 10 (human)
Band	10p11.23	Start	30,434,021 bp
Band	10p11.23	End	30,461,833 bp

Gene location (Mouse)
Chr.	Chromosome 18 (mouse)
Band	18 A1|18 2.73 cM	Start	4,331,327 bp
Band	18 A1|18 2.73 cM	End	4,353,015 bp
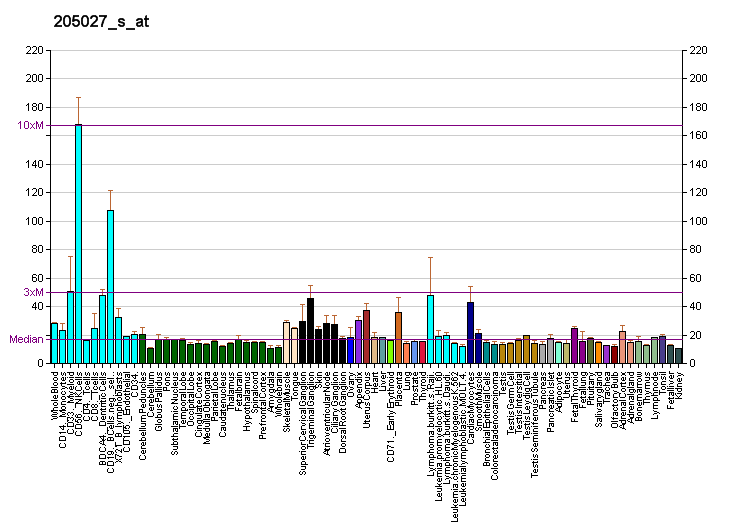
RNA expression pattern
Bgee	Human / Mouse (ortholog); Top expressed in: gastric mucosa; mucosa of paranasal sinus; upper lobe of left lung; left uterine tube; germinal epithelium; monocyte; olfactory zone of nasal mucosa; Achilles tendon; tibial nerve; right lung / Top expressed in: granulocyte; saccule; lip; otic placode; skin of external ear; stroma of bone marrow; spleen; otic vesicle; hair follicle; subcutaneous adipose tissue; More reference expression data
BioGPS	More reference expression data
Gene ontology
Molecular function	transferase activity; nucleotide binding; protein kinase activity; metal ion binding; kinase activity; protein binding; ATP binding; magnesium ion binding; MAP kinase kinase kinase activity; protein serine/threonine kinase activity
Cellular component	cytosol; cytoplasm
Biological process	phosphorylation; immune system process; T cell costimulation; stress-activated MAPK cascade; cell cycle; signal transduction; protein phosphorylation; regulation of mitotic cell cycle; stress-activated protein kinase signaling cascade; activation of protein kinase activity; regulation of apoptotic process; interleukin-1-mediated signaling pathway
Sources:Amigo / QuickGO
Orthologs
Databases	NCBI: entry; OMA: entry
Species	Human	Mouse
Entrez	1326	26410
Ensembl	ENSG00000107968	ENSMUSG00000024235
UniProt	P41279	Q07174
RefSeq (mRNA)	NM_001244134; NM_005204; NM_001320961	NM_007746
RefSeq (protein)	NP_001231063; NP_001307890; NP_005195	NP_031772
Location (UCSC)	Chr 10: 30.43 – 30.46 Mb	Chr 18: 4.33 – 4.35 Mb
PubMed search
- Wikidata
View/Edit Human	View/Edit Mouse

Mitogen-activated protein kinase kinase kinase 8 is an enzyme that in humans is encoded by the MAP3K8 gene.

== Function ==
The gene was identified by its oncogenic transforming activity in cells. The encoded protein is a member of the serine/threonine-specific protein kinase family. This kinase can activate ERK1, ERK2 and p38 MAP kinases. This kinase was shown to activate IkappaB kinases, and thus induce the nuclear production of NF-kappaB. This kinase was also found to promote the production of TNF-alpha and IL-2 during T lymphocyte activation. Studies of a similar gene in rat suggested the direct involvement of this kinase in the proteolysis of NF-kappaB1, p105 (NFKB1). This gene may also start transcription at a downstream in-frame translation start codon, and thus produce an isoform containing a shorter N-terminus. The shorter isoform has been shown to display weaker transforming activity. In mice, the gene is known as TPL2 and is a tumor-suppressor gene whose absence contributes to the development and progression of cancer. However, it functions in other organs as a oncogene, promoting cancer.

== Interactions ==
MAP3K8 has been shown to interact with AKT1, CHUK, NFKB2, NFKB1, C22orf25 and TNIP2.
