= RELA =

Protein-coding gene in the species Homo sapiens

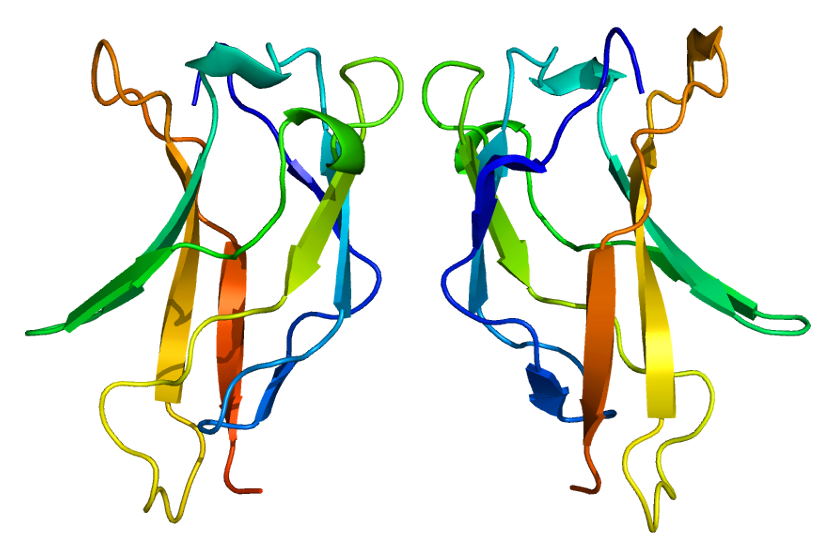

Identifiers
- Aliases: RELA, NFKB3, p65, RELA proto-oncogene, NF-kB subunit, CMCU
- External IDs: OMIM: 164014; MGI: 103290; GeneCards: RELA
Available structures
PDB	Ortholog search: PDBe RCSB
PDB	List of PDB id codes 4KV4, 1NFI, 2LSP, 2O61, 3GUT, 3QXY, 3RC0, 4KV1, 2N22

Gene location (Human)
Chr.	Chromosome 11 (human)
Band	11q13.1	Start	65,653,599 bp
Band	11q13.1	End	65,663,090 bp

Gene location (Mouse)
Chr.	Chromosome 19 (mouse)
Band	19 A|19 4.34 cM	Start	5,687,511 bp
Band	19 A|19 4.34 cM	End	5,698,158 bp
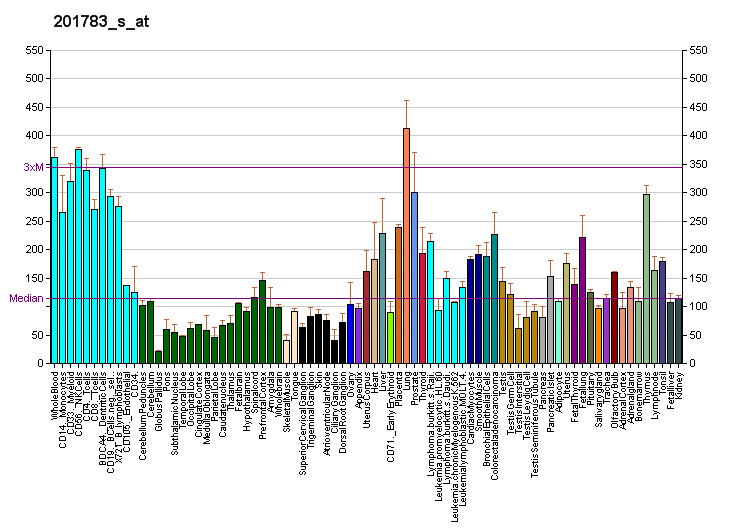

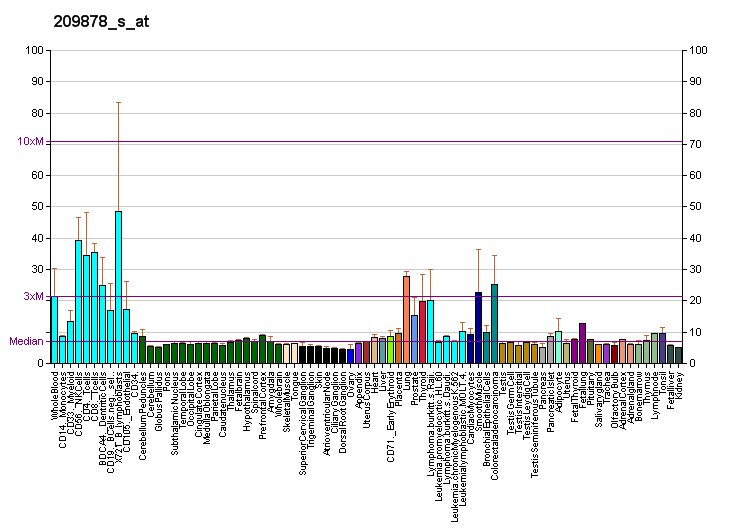
RNA expression pattern
Bgee	Human / Mouse (ortholog); Top expressed in: gastric mucosa; popliteal artery; tibial arteries; left uterine tube; cartilage tissue; right lung; ascending aorta; Descending thoracic aorta; ectocervix; right coronary artery / Top expressed in: lactiferous gland; choroid plexus of fourth ventricle; granulocyte; external carotid artery; internal carotid artery; gastrula; genital tubercle; mesenteric lymph nodes; stroma of bone marrow; right lung; More reference expression data
BioGPS	More reference expression data
Gene ontology
Molecular function	protein N-terminus binding; ankyrin repeat binding; DNA-binding transcription activator activity, RNA polymerase II-specific; histone deacetylase binding; enzyme binding; phosphate ion binding; RNA polymerase II cis-regulatory region sequence-specific DNA binding; protein homodimerization activity; chromatin binding; NF-kappaB binding; protein binding; protein kinase binding; DNA binding; sequence-specific DNA binding; actinin binding; protein heterodimerization activity; transcription factor activity, RNA polymerase II distal enhancer sequence-specific binding; chromatin DNA binding; ubiquitin protein ligase binding; RNA polymerase II general transcription initiation factor activity; RNA polymerase II transcription regulatory region sequence-specific DNA binding; DNA-binding transcription factor activity; DNA-binding transcription repressor activity, RNA polymerase II-specific; identical protein binding; DNA-binding transcription factor activity, RNA polymerase II-specific; transcription factor binding; protein-containing complex binding
Cellular component	cytoplasm; cytosol; I-kappaB/NF-kappaB complex; transcription regulator complex; NF-kappaB complex; nucleoplasm; nucleus; nucleolus; NF-kappaB p50/p65 complex; protein-containing complex; synapse; glutamatergic synapse
Biological process	response to amino acid; response to interleukin-1; cellular response to interleukin-6; response to progesterone; response to organic substance; Fc-epsilon receptor signaling pathway; negative regulation of insulin receptor signaling pathway; defense response to virus; positive regulation of chondrocyte differentiation; animal organ morphogenesis; response to muscle stretch; response to cytokine; negative regulation of protein catabolic process; cytokine-mediated signaling pathway; negative regulation of extrinsic apoptotic signaling pathway; response to mechanical stimulus; response to muramyl dipeptide; stimulatory C-type lectin receptor signaling pathway; transcription, DNA-templated; response to insulin; negative regulation of NIK/NF-kappaB signaling; nucleotide-binding oligomerization domain containing 2 signaling pathway; membrane protein intracellular domain proteolysis; inflammatory response; viral process; response to cobalamin; hair follicle development; positive regulation of miRNA metabolic process; acetaldehyde metabolic process; cellular response to hepatocyte growth factor stimulus; cellular response to nicotine; negative regulation of apoptotic process; cellular defense response; response to morphine; response to lipopolysaccharide; cellular response to interleukin-1; response to inorganic substance; regulation of inflammatory response; response to cAMP; negative regulation of transcription, DNA-templated; response to hydrogen peroxide; positive regulation of Schwann cell differentiation; defense response; response to bacterium; response to organic cyclic compound; ageing; positive regulation of cell population proliferation; positive regulation of I-kappaB kinase/NF-kappaB signaling; liver development; response to UV-B; T cell receptor signaling pathway; cellular response to lipopolysaccharide; positive regulation of type I interferon production; positive regulation of transcription by RNA polymerase II; cellular response to hydrogen peroxide; regulation of transcription, DNA-templated; tumor necrosis factor-mediated signaling pathway; positive regulation of transcription, DNA-templated; positive regulation of T cell receptor signaling pathway; positive regulation of NF-kappaB transcription factor activity; cellular response to peptidoglycan; cellular response to tumor necrosis factor; regulation of NIK/NF-kappaB signaling; positive regulation of NIK/NF-kappaB signaling; positive regulation of transcription from RNA polymerase II promoter involved in cellular response to chemical stimulus; positive regulation of pri-miRNA transcription by RNA polymerase II; regulation of DNA-templated transcription in response to stress; cellular response to lipoteichoic acid; negative regulation of transcription by RNA polymerase II; negative regulation of protein sumoylation; pri-miRNA transcription by RNA polymerase II; cellular response to angiotensin; interleukin-1-mediated signaling pathway; cellular response to vascular endothelial growth factor stimulus; negative regulation of pri-miRNA transcription by RNA polymerase II; postsynapse to nucleus signaling pathway; chromatin organization; I-kappaB kinase/NF-kappaB signaling; NIK/NF-kappaB signaling; positive regulation of leukocyte adhesion to vascular endothelial cell
Sources:Amigo / QuickGO
Orthologs
Databases	NCBI: entry; OMA: entry
Species	Human	Mouse
Entrez	5970	19697
Ensembl	ENSG00000173039	ENSMUSG00000024927
UniProt	Q04206	Q04207
RefSeq (mRNA)	NM_001145138; NM_001243984; NM_001243985; NM_021975	NM_009045; NM_001365067
RefSeq (protein)	NP_001138610; NP_001230913; NP_001230914; NP_068810	NP_033071; NP_001351996
Location (UCSC)	Chr 11: 65.65 – 65.66 Mb	Chr 19: 5.69 – 5.7 Mb
PubMed search
- Wikidata
View/Edit Human	View/Edit Mouse

Transcription factor p65 also known as nuclear factor NF-kappa-B p65 subunit is a protein that in humans is encoded by the RELA gene.

RELA, also known as p65, is a REL-associated protein involved in NF-κB heterodimer formation, nuclear translocation and activation. NF-κB is an essential transcription factor complex involved in all types of cellular processes, including cellular metabolism, chemotaxis, etc. Phosphorylation and acetylation of RELA are crucial post-translational modifications required for NF-κB activation. RELA has also been shown to modulate immune responses, and activation of RELA is positively associated with multiple types of cancer.

== Gene and expression ==
RELA, or v-rel avian reticuloendotheliosis viral oncogene homolog A, is also known as p65 or NFKB3. It is located on chromosome 11 q13, and its nucleotide sequence is 1473 nucleotide long. RELA protein has four isoforms, the longest and the predominant one being 551 amino acids. RELA is expressed alongside p50 in various cell types, including epithelial/endothelial cells and neuronal tissues.

== Structure ==
RELA is one member of the NF-κB family, one of the essential transcription factors under intensive study. Seven proteins encoded by five genes are involved in the NF-κB complex, namely p105, p100, p50, p52, RELA, c-REL and RELB. Like other proteins in this complex, RELA contains a N-terminal REL-homology domain (RHD), and also a C-terminal transactivation domain (TAD). RHD is involved in DNA binding, dimerization and NF-κB/REL inhibitor interaction. On the other hand, TAD is responsible for interacting with the basal transcription complex including many coactivators of transcription such as TBP, TFIIB and CREB-CBP. RELA and p50 is the mostly commonly found heterodimer complex among NF-κB homodimers and heterodimers, and is the functional component participating in nuclear translocation and activation of NF-κB.

RELA is a 65 kDa protein.

=== Phosphorylation ===
Phosphorylation of RELA plays a key role in regulating NF-κB activation and function. Subsequent to NF-κB nuclear translocation, RELA undergoes site-specific post-translational modifications to further enhance the NF-κB function as a transcription factor. RELA can either be phosphorylated in the RHD region or the TAD region, attracting different interaction partners. Triggered by lipopolysaccharide (LPS), protein kinase A (PKA) specifically phosphorylates serine 276 in the RHD domain in the cytoplasm, controlling NF-κB DNA-binding and oligomerization. On the other hand, mitogen and stress-activated kinase 1 (MSK1) are also able to phosphorylate RELA at residue 276 under TNFα induction in the nucleus, increasing NF-κB response at the transcriptional level. Phosphorylation of serine 311 by protein kinase C zeta type (PKCζ) serves the same purpose. Two residues in the TAD region are targeted by phosphorylation. After IL-1or TNFα stimulation, serine 529 is phosphorylated by casein kinase II (CKII), while serine 536 is phosphorylated by IκB kinases (IKKs). In response to DNA damage, ribosomal subunit kinase-1 (RSK1) also has the ability to phosphorylate RELA at serine 536 in a p53-dependent manner. A couple of other kinases are also able to phosphorylate RELA at different conditions, including glycogen-synthase kinase-3β (GSK3β), AKT/phosphatidylinositol 3-kinase (PI3K) and NF-κB activating kinase (NAK, i.e. TANK-binding kinase-1 (TBK1) and TRAF2-associated kinase (T2K)). The fact that RELA can be modified by a collection of kinases via phosphorylation at different sites/regions within the protein under different stimulations might suggest a synergistic effect of these modifications. Phosphorylation at these sites enhances NF-κB transcriptional response via tightened binding to transcription coactivators. For example, CBP and p300 binding to RELA are enhanced when serine 276 or 311 is phosphorylated. Status of several phosphorylation sites determines RELA stability mediated by the ubiquitin-mediated proteolysis. Cell-type-specific phosphorylation is also observed for RELA. Multiple-site phosphorylation is common in endothelial cells, and different cell types may contain different stimuli, leading to targeted phosphorylation of RELA by different kinases. For instance, IKK2 is found to be mainly responsible for phosphorylating serine 536 in monocytes and macrophages, or in CD40 receptor binding in hepatic stellate cells. IKK1 functions as the major kinase phosphorylating serine 536 under different stimuli, such as the ligand activation of the lymphotoxin-β receptor (LTβR).

=== Acetylation ===
In vivo studies revealed that RELA is also under acetylation modification in the nucleus, which is just as important as phosphorylation as a post-translational modification of proteins. Lysines 218, 221 and 310 are acetylation targets within RELA, and response to acetylation is site-specific. For instance, lysine 221 acetylation facilitates RELA dissociation from IκBα and enhances its DNA-binding affinity. Lysine 310 acetylation is indispensable for the full transcriptional activity of RELA, but does not affect its DNA-binding ability. Hypothesis about RELA acetylation suggests acetylation aids its subsequent recognition by transcriptional co-activators with bromodomains, which are specialized in recognizing acetylated lysine residues. Lysine 122 and 123 acetylation are found to be negatively correlated with RELA transcriptional activation. Unknown mechanisms mediate the acetylation of RELA possibly using p300/CBP and p300/CBP factor associated coactivators under TNFα or phorbol myristate acetate (PMF) stimulation both in vivo and in vitro. RELA is also under the control of deacetylation via HDAC, and HDAC3 is the mediator of this process both in vivo and in vitro.

=== Methylation ===
Methylation of lysine 218 and 221 together or lysine 37 alone in the RHD domain of RELA can lead to increased response to cytokines such as IL-1 in mammalian cell culture.

== Interactions ==
As the prototypical heterodimer complex member of the NF-κB, together with p50, RELA/p65 interacts with various proteins in both the cytoplasm and in the nucleus during the process of classical NF-κB activation and nuclear translocation. In the inactive state, RELA/p50 complex is mainly sequestered by IκBα in the cytosol. TNFα, LPS and other factors serve as activation inducers, followed by phosphorylation at residue 32 and 36 of IκBα, leading to rapid degradation of IκBα via the ubiquitin-proteasomal system and subsequent release of RELA/p50 complex. RELA nuclear localization signal used to be sequestered by IκBα is now exposed, and rapid translocation of the NF-κB occurs. In parallel, there is a non-classical NF-κB activation pathway involving the proteolytic cleavage of p100 into p52 instead of p50. This process does not require RELA, hence will not be discussed in detail here. After NF-κB nuclear localization due to TNFα stimulation, p50/RELA heterodimer will function as a transcription factor and bind to a variety of genes involved in all kinds of biological processes, such as leukocyte activation/chemotaxis, negative regulation of TNFIKK pathway, cellular metabolism, antigen processing, just to name a few . Phosphorylation of RELA at different residues also enables its interaction with CDKs and P-TEFb. Phosphorylation at serine 276 in RELA allows its interaction with P-TEFb containing CDK9 and cyclin T1 subunits, and phospho-ser276 RELA-P-TEFb complex is necessary for IL-8 and Gro-β activation. Another mechanism is involved in the activation of genes preloaded with Pol II in a RELA serine 276 phosphorylation independent manner.

RELA has been shown to interact with:

- APBA2,
- AHR,
- ASCC3,
- BRCA1,
- BTRC,
- c-Fos,
- c-Jun,
- C22orf25,
- CDK9,
- CEBPB,
- CEBPE,
- CREBBP,
- CSNK2A1,
- CSNK2A2,
- DHX9,
- EP300,
- ETHE1,
- FUS,
- GCN5,
- HDAC1,
- HDAC2,
- HDAC3,
- ING4,
- IκBα,
- KLF5,
- MDM2,
- MEN1,
- MSK1,
- MTPN,
- NCF1,
- NFKB1,
- NFKB2,
- NFKBIB,
- NFKBIE,
- NR3C1,
- NCOR2,
- PARP1,
- PDLIM2,
- PIAS3,
- PIM1,
- PIN1,
- PKA,
- POU2F1,
- PPARG,
- PPP1R13L,
- PRKCZ,
- REL,
- RFC1,
- RNF25,
- SIRT1,
- SOCS1,
- SP1,
- STAT3,
- TAF4B,
- TBP,
- TP53, and
- TRIB3.

== Role in immune system ==
Gene knockout of NF-κB genes via homologous recombination in mice showed the role of these components in innate and adaptive immune responses. RELA knockout mice is embryonic lethal due to liver apoptosis. Lymphocyte activation failure is also observed, suggesting that RELA is indispensable in the proper development of the immune system. In comparison, deletion of other REL-related genes will not cause embryonic development failure, though different levels of defects are also noted. The fact that cytokines such as TNFα and IL-1 can stimulate the activation of RELA also supports its participation in immune response. In general, RELA participates in adaptive immunity and responses to invading pathogens via NF-κB activation. Mice without individual NF-κB proteins are deficient in B- and T-cell activation and proliferation, cytokine production and isotype switching. Mutations in RELA is found responsible for inflammatory bowel disease as well.

== Cancer ==
NF-κB/RELA activation has been found to be correlated with cancer development, suggesting the potential of RELA as a cancer biomarker. Specific modification patterns of RELA have also been observed in many cancer types.

=== Prostate ===
RELA may have a potential role as biomarker for prostate cancer progression and metastases, as suggested by the association found between RELA nuclear localization and prostate cancer aggressiveness and biochemical recurrence.

=== Thyroid ===
Strong correlation between nuclear localization of RELA and clinicopathological parameters for papillary thyroid carcinoma (PTC), suggesting the role of NF-κB activation in tumor growth and aggressiveness in PTC. Other than usage as a biomarker, serine 536 phosphorylation in RELA is also correlated with nuclear translocation and the expression of some transactivating genes such as COX-2, IL-8 and GST-pi in follicular thyroid carcinomas via morphoproteomic analysis.

=== Leukemia ===
Mutations in the transactivation domain of RELA can lead to decrease in transactivating ability and this mutation can be found in lymphoid neoplasia.

=== Head and neck ===
Nuclear localization of NF-κB/RELA is positively correlated with tumor micrometastases into lymph and blood and negatively correlated with patient survival outcome in patients with head and neck squamous cell carcinoma (HNSCC). This suggests a role of NF-κB/RELA as a possible target for targeted-therapy.

=== Breast ===
There is both a physical and a functional association between RELA and aryl hydrocarbon receptor (AhR), and the subsequent activation of c-myc gene transcription in breast cancer cells. Another paper reported interactions between estrogen receptor (ER) and NF-κB members, including p50 and RELA. It is shown that ERα interacts with both p50 and RELA in vitro and in vivo, and RELA antibody can reduce ERα:ERE complex formation. The paper claims a mutual repression between ER and NF-κB.

=== Monogenic Behçet's Disease-like conditions ===
Behçet's disease-like conditions are increasingly recognized and to date predominantly involve loss-of-function variants in TNFAIP3. However, a RELA mutation that results in truncated protein variant has been reported to cause severe autoinflammatory disease due to impaired NF-κB signaling and increased apoptosis. The phenotypes associated with this disease include mucocutaneous ulcerative syndrome and neuromyelitis optica (NMO).
