= BCL3ANT =

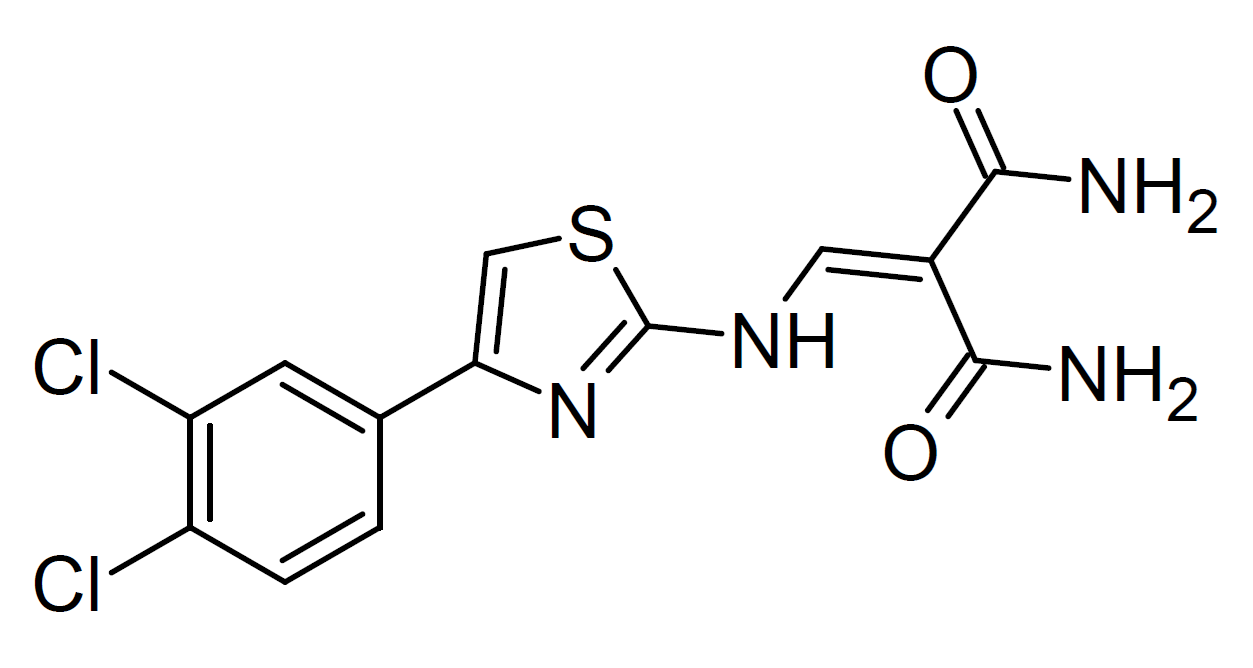

Identifiers
- IUPAC name: 2-[[[4-(3,4-dichlorophenyl)-1,3-thiazol-2-yl]amino]methylidene]propanediamide
- CAS Number: 910855-84-4
- PubChem CID: 377887
- ChemSpider: 335043
- ChEMBL: ChEMBL1617694

Chemical and physical data
- Formula: C_{13}H_{10}Cl_{2}N_{4}O_{2}S
- Molar mass: 357.21 g·mol^{−1}
- 3D model (JSmol): Interactive image
- SMILES: C1=CC(=C(C=C1C2=CSC(=N2)NC=C(C(=O)N)C(=O)N)Cl)Cl
- InChI: InChI=1S/C13H10Cl2N4O2S/c14-8-2-1-6(3-9(8)15)10-5-22-13(19-10)18-4-7(11(16)20)12(17)21/h1-5H,(H2,16,20)(H2,17,21)(H,18,19); Key:NYUREPFBBIUCSR-UHFFFAOYSA-N

BCL3ANT is an experimental anticancer drug which acts as an inhibitor of BCL3-mediated expression of cyclin D1, which is important for the proliferation and metastasis of certain types of cancer such as lymphoma and melanoma. BCL3ANT is of relatively low potency and is unlikely to be developed as a medicine in its own right, however as the first drug developed which inhibits BCL3-mediated cyclin D1 expression it is of academic interest in this area and is likely to lead to the development of more potent drugs acting through this pathway, which may be useful as anticancer medications.
