= DAVID syndrome =

Genetic disorder

- Specialty: Medical genetics, immunology

DAVID syndrome, short for deficient anterior pituitary with variable immune deficiency syndrome, is a rare genetic disorder that is characterized by adrenocorticotropic hormone deficiency combined with common variable immunodeficiency and hypogammaglobulinemia, which is caused by a heterozygous mutation in the NFKB2 gene. It is also known to lead to symptomatic hypoglycemia.
