= Rel homology domain =

Protein domain

Rel homology domain (RHD)
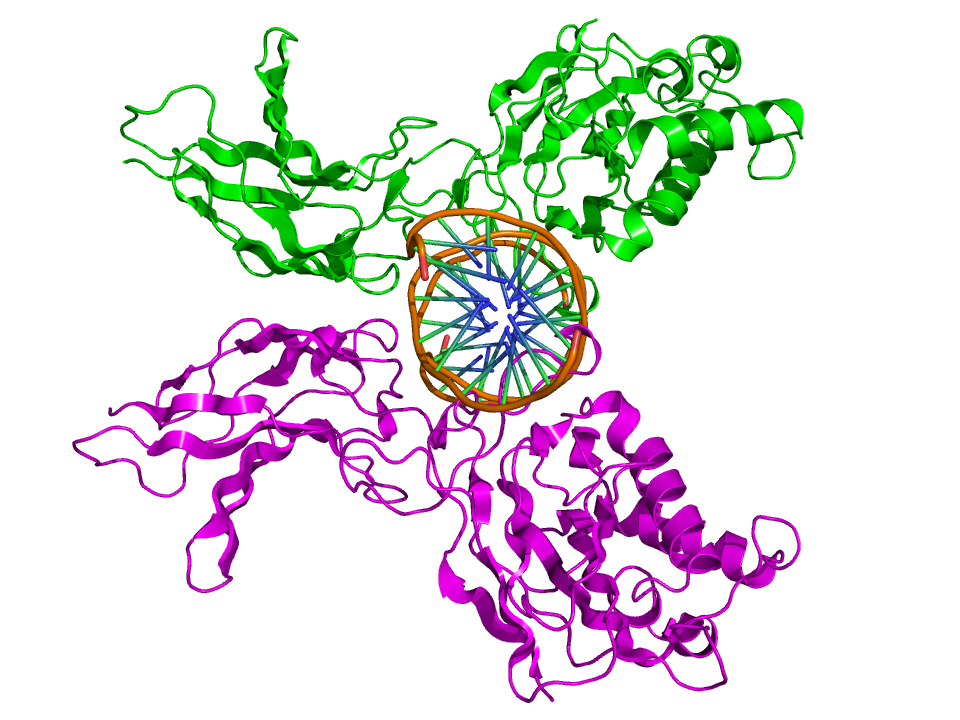
- Top view of the crystal structure of a homodimer of the Rel homology domains of NFKB1 (green and magenta) bound to DNA (orange).

Identifiers
- Symbol: RHD
- Pfam: PF00554
- InterPro: IPR011539
- PROSITE: PDOC00924
- SCOP2: 1svc / SCOPe / SUPFAM
- CDD: cd07827
Available protein structures:
- PDB: 1a02, 1a3q, 1a66, 1bvo, 1gji, 1ikn, 1imh, le5, le9, 1lei, 1nfa,1nfi, 1nfk, 1ooa, 1owr, 1p7h, 1pzu, 1ram, 1s9k, 1svc, 1uur, 1uus,1vkx, 2as5, 2ram IPR011539 PF00554 (ECOD; PDBsum)
- AlphaFold: IPR011539; PF00554

The Rel homology domain (RHD) is a protein domain found in a family of eukaryotic transcription factors, including both NF-κB and NFAT, among others. Some of these transcription factors appear to form multi-protein DNA-bound complexes. Phosphorylation of the RHD appears to play a role in the regulation of some of these transcription factors, acting to modulate the expression of their target genes.

The RHD is composed of two immunoglobulin-like beta barrel subdomains that grip the DNA in the major groove. The N-terminal specificity domain resembles the core domain of the p53 transcription factor, and contains a recognition loop that interacts with DNA bases. In the case of NF-κB, the C-terminal dimerization subdomain determines dimerization propensity with other proteins in the NF-κB/Rel protein family. The dimerization subdomain is immediately followed by a nuclear localization sequence that also comprises the site for inhibitory interactions with IκB.
