= NFKB2 =

Protein-coding gene in the species Homo sapiens

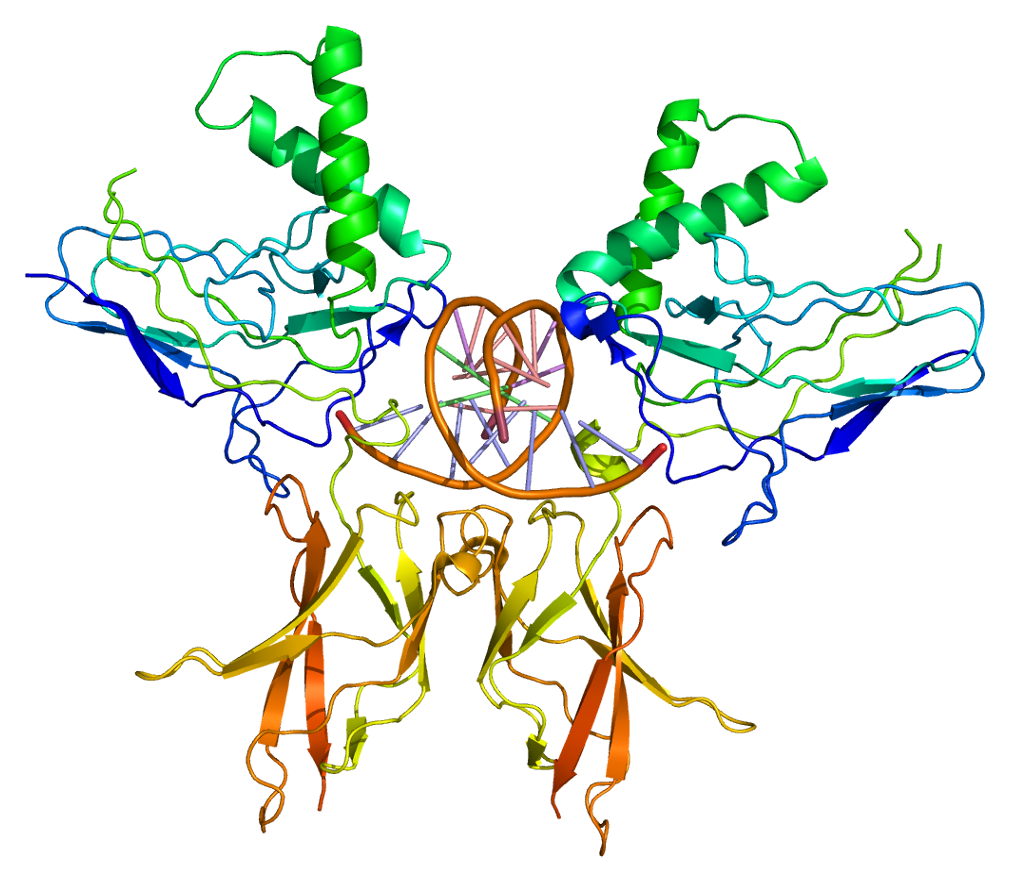

Identifiers
- Aliases: NFKB2, CVID10, H2TF1, LYT-10, LYT10, NF-kB2, p105, p52, p100, p49/p100, nuclear factor kappa B subunit 2
- External IDs: OMIM: 164012; MGI: 1099800; GeneCards: NFKB2
Available structures
PDB	Ortholog search: PDBe RCSB
PDB	List of PDB id codes 1A3Q, 2D96, 3DO7, 4OT9

Gene location (Human)
Chr.	Chromosome 10 (human)
Band	10q24.32	Start	102,394,110 bp
Band	10q24.32	End	102,402,524 bp

Gene location (Mouse)
Chr.	Chromosome 19 (mouse)
Band	19 C3|19 38.8 cM	Start	46,292,759 bp
Band	19 C3|19 38.8 cM	End	46,300,824 bp
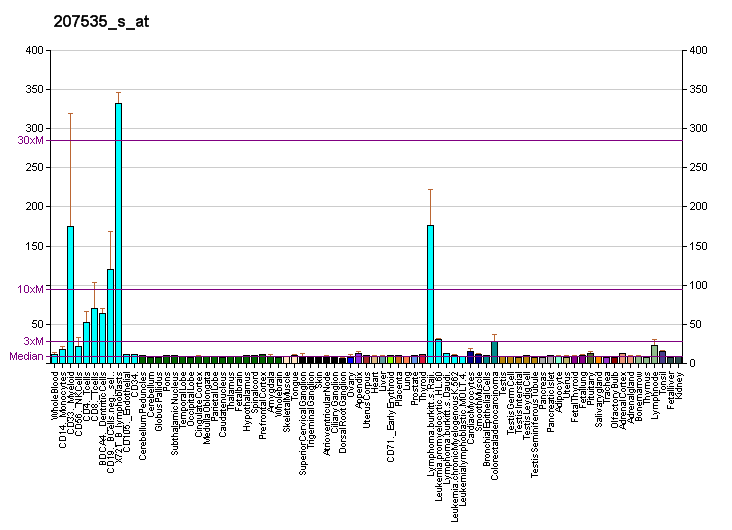

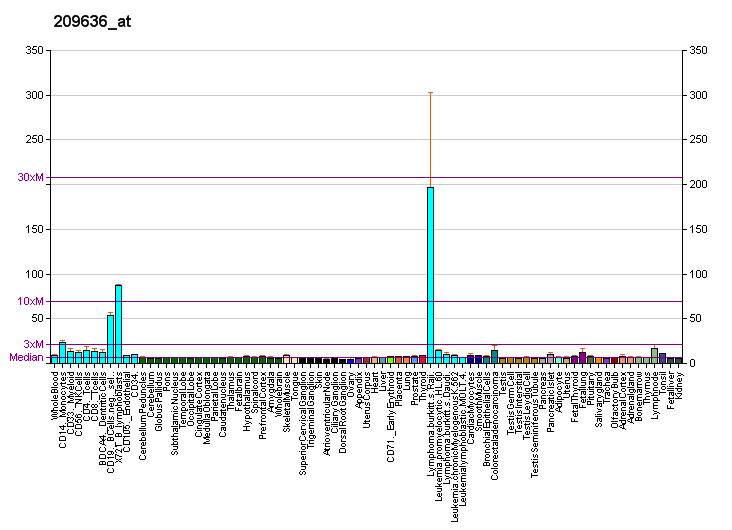
RNA expression pattern
Bgee	Human / Mouse (ortholog); Top expressed in: granulocyte; muscle layer of sigmoid colon; spleen; epithelium of colon; monocyte; left uterine tube; lymph node; upper lobe of left lung; gallbladder; sural nerve / Top expressed in: mesenteric lymph nodes; granulocyte; spleen; aortic valve; cumulus cell; ascending aorta; motor neuron; thymus; lip; renal vein; More reference expression data
BioGPS	More reference expression data
Gene ontology
Molecular function	DNA binding; DNA-binding transcription factor activity; transcription coactivator activity; DNA-binding transcription activator activity, RNA polymerase II-specific; chromatin binding; RNA polymerase II cis-regulatory region sequence-specific DNA binding; protein binding; DNA-binding transcription factor activity, RNA polymerase II-specific
Cellular component	cytoplasm; Bcl3/NF-kappaB2 complex; nucleus; nucleoplasm; cytosol
Biological process	response to cytokine; regulation of transcription, DNA-templated; rhythmic process; germinal center formation; ageing; extracellular matrix organization; negative regulation of transcription by RNA polymerase II; spleen development; transcription, DNA-templated; follicular dendritic cell differentiation; response to lipopolysaccharide; NIK/NF-kappaB signaling; positive regulation of NF-kappaB transcription factor activity; inflammatory response; I-kappaB kinase/NF-kappaB signaling; positive regulation of type I interferon production; positive regulation of transcription by RNA polymerase II; signal transduction; transcription by RNA polymerase II; innate immune response
Sources:Amigo / QuickGO
Orthologs
Databases	NCBI: entry; OMA: entry
Species	Human	Mouse
Entrez	4791	18034
Ensembl	ENSG00000077150	ENSMUSG00000025225
UniProt	Q00653	Q9WTK5
RefSeq (mRNA)	NM_001077494; NM_001261403; NM_001288724; NM_002502; NM_001322934 NM_001322935	NM_001177369; NM_001177370; NM_019408
RefSeq (protein)	NP_001070962; NP_001248332; NP_001275653; NP_001309863; NP_001309864 NP_002493	NP_001170840; NP_001170841; NP_062281
Location (UCSC)	Chr 10: 102.39 – 102.4 Mb	Chr 19: 46.29 – 46.3 Mb
PubMed search
- Wikidata
View/Edit Human	View/Edit Mouse

Nuclear factor NF-kappa-B p100 subunit is a protein that in humans is encoded by the NFKB2 gene.

== Function ==
NF-κB has been detected in numerous cell types that express cytokines, chemokines, growth factors, cell adhesion molecules, and some acute phase proteins in health and in various disease states. NF-κB is activated by a wide variety of stimuli such as cytokines, oxidant-free radicals, inhaled particles, ultraviolet irradiation, and bacterial or viral products. Inappropriate activation of NF-kappa-B has been linked to inflammatory events associated with autoimmune arthritis, asthma, septic shock, lung fibrosis, glomerulonephritis, atherosclerosis, and AIDS.

In contrast, complete and persistent inhibition of NF-kappa-B has been linked directly to apoptosis, inappropriate immune cell development, and delayed cell growth. For reviews, see Chen et al. (1999) and Baldwin (1996).

== Clinical significance ==
Though the majority of cases of common variable immunodeficiency (CVID) are not linked to single-genes defects, pathogenic variants in the NFKB2 gene have been identified as one of the possible monogenic causes of the disease. The frequency of NFKB2 mutation in CVID population is yet to be established.

The protein NFKB2 can become mutated and lead to hereditary endocrine and immuneodeficiences. The mutation occurs at the C-terminus of NFKB2 and it causes common variable immunodeficienciency which in turn causes endocrine deficiency and immunodeficiencies. A NFKB2 mutation can cause things like adrenocorticotropic hormone deficiency and DAVID syndrome which is a pituitary hormone deficiency and CVID.

The mutations that occur within the C-terminus affect the serine 866 and 870. These serines are considered phosphorylation sites for NFKB2. These mutations at the serine's in the C-terminus lead to CVID in combination with other endocrine deficiencies. These endocrine deficiencies along with the mutation of NFKB2, lead scientists to believe that mutation of NFKB2 is a rare hereditary disease called DAVID's disease.

== Interactions ==
NFKB2 has been shown to interact with:

- BCL3,
- BTRC,
- MAP3K8,
- NFKB1,
- NFKBIE,
- RELA,
- RELB,
- REL, and
- TSC22D3.

== See also ==
- NF-κB
- DAVID syndrome
