= TSC22D3 =

Protein-coding gene in the species Homo sapiens

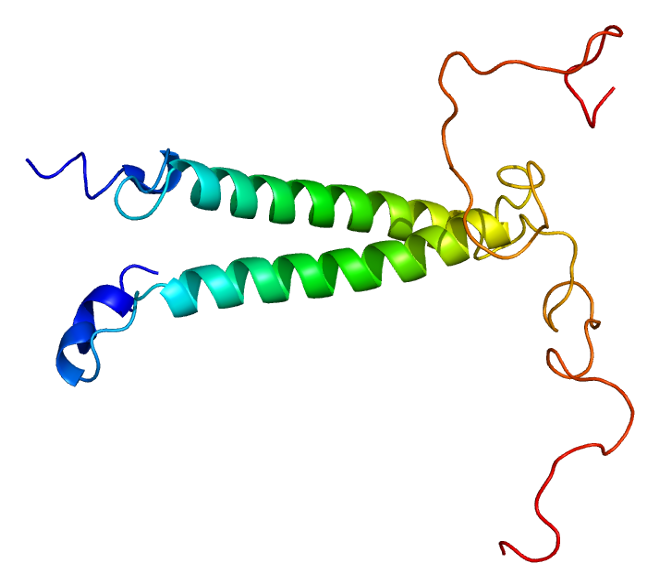

Identifiers
- Aliases: TSC22D3, DIP, DSIPI, GILZ, TSC-22R, hDIP, TSC22 domain family member 3
- External IDs: OMIM: 300506; MGI: 1196284; GeneCards: TSC22D3

Gene location (Human)
Chr.	X chromosome (human)
Band	Xq22.3	Start	107,713,221 bp
Band	Xq22.3	End	107,777,342 bp

Gene location (Mouse)
Chr.	X chromosome (mouse)
Band	X|X F1	Start	139,440,277 bp
Band	X|X F1	End	139,501,408 bp
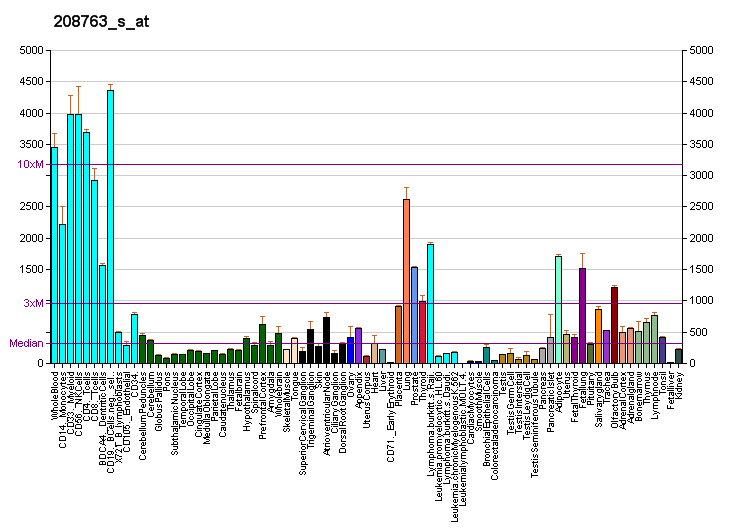

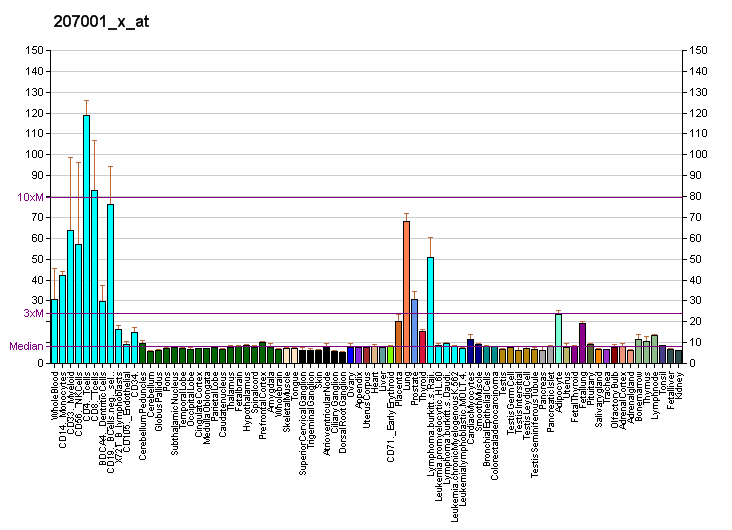
RNA expression pattern
Bgee	Human / Mouse (ortholog); Top expressed in: right lung; gastric mucosa; popliteal artery; tibial arteries; tibial nerve; left coronary artery; blood; left uterine tube; Achilles tendon; olfactory bulb / Top expressed in: muscle of thigh; umbilical cord; medial head of gastrocnemius muscle; right lung lobe; stroma of bone marrow; left lung lobe; temporal muscle; triceps brachii muscle; ankle; sternocleidomastoid muscle; More reference expression data
BioGPS	More reference expression data
Gene ontology
Molecular function	MRF binding; protein binding; DNA-binding transcription factor activity; DNA-binding transcription factor activity, RNA polymerase II-specific
Cellular component	cytosol; cytoplasm; nucleus
Biological process	response to osmotic stress; ion transmembrane transport; regulation of transcription, DNA-templated; negative regulation of transcription by RNA polymerase II; negative regulation of skeletal muscle tissue development; negative regulation of activation-induced cell death of T cells; regulation of transcription by RNA polymerase II
Sources:Amigo / QuickGO
Orthologs
Databases	NCBI: entry; OMA: entry
Species	Human	Mouse
Entrez	1831	14605
Ensembl	ENSG00000157514	ENSMUSG00000031431
UniProt	Q99576	Q9Z2S7
RefSeq (mRNA)	NM_001015881; NM_004089; NM_198057; NM_001318468; NM_001318470	NM_001077364; NM_010286
RefSeq (protein)	NP_001015881; NP_001305397; NP_001305399; NP_004080; NP_932174	NP_001070832; NP_034416
Location (UCSC)	Chr X: 107.71 – 107.78 Mb	Chr X: 139.44 – 139.5 Mb
PubMed search
- Wikidata
View/Edit Human	View/Edit Mouse

TSC22 domain family protein 3 is a protein that in humans is encoded by the TSC22D3 gene.

== Function ==
The protein encoded by this gene shares significant sequence identity with the murine TSC-22 and Drosophila shs, both of which are leucine zipper proteins, that function as transcriptional regulators. GILZ shows ubiquitous expression across tissues, including thymus, spleen, lung, fat, liver, kidney, heart, and skeletal muscle. The expression of this gene is stimulated by glucocorticoids and interleukin 10, and it appears to play a key role in the anti-inflammatory and immunosuppressive effects of this steroid and chemokine. Transcript variants encoding different isoforms have been identified for this gene.

== Interactions ==
TSC22D3 has been shown to interact with C-Raf, NFKB2 and NFKB1.
