= Iguratimod =

Chemical compound with medical applications

Clinical data
- Trade names: Careram; Kolbet
- Other names: T-614
- ATC code: None

Identifiers
- IUPAC name: N-(3-Formamido-4-oxo-6-phenoxy-4H-chromen-7-yl)methanesulfonamide
- CAS Number: 123663-49-0
- PubChem CID: 124246
- ChemSpider: 110694
- UNII: 4IHY34Y2NV
- ChEMBL: ChEMBL2107455
- CompTox Dashboard (EPA): DTXSID0048971
- ECHA InfoCard: 100.236.037

Chemical and physical data
- Formula: C_{17}H_{14}N_{2}O_{6}S
- Molar mass: 374.37 g·mol^{−1}
- 3D model (JSmol): Interactive image
- SMILES: O=S(=O)(Nc3c(Oc1ccccc1)cc2c(O/C=C(\C2=O)NC=O)c3)C
- InChI: InChI=1S/C17H14N2O6S/c1-26(22,23)19-13-8-15-12(17(21)14(9-24-15)18-10-20)7-16(13)25-11-5-3-2-4-6-11/h2-10,19H,1H3,(H,18,20); Key:ANMATWQYLIFGOK-UHFFFAOYSA-N

Iguratimod is an anti-inflammatory small molecule drug used for the treatment of rheumatoid arthritis, together with methotrexate in Japan and China. As of 2015, the biological target was not known, but it prevents NF-κB activation and subsequently selectively inhibits COX-2 and several inflammatory cytokines.

Adverse effects include elevated transaminases, nausea, vomiting, stomach pain, rashes, and itchiness.

It is a derivative of 7-methanesulfonylamino-6-phenoxychromone and is a chromone with two amide groups; it was first reported in 2000. It was submitted for regulatory approval in Japan in 2003; the application was withdrawn in 2009, and it was resubmitted with additional data in 2011 and approved for marketing in Japan in 2012. Eisai and Toyama Chemical market it in Japan. Approval was obtained in China in 2011 by Simcere, independently of the Japanese originators.

During discovery and development it was called T-614 and it is marketed under the names Careram and Kolbet.
