= TANGO2 =

Protein-coding gene in the species Homo sapiens

Identifiers
- Aliases: TANGO2, C22orf25, MECRCN, transport and golgi organization 2 homolog
- External IDs: OMIM: 616830; MGI: 101825; GeneCards: TANGO2

Gene location (Human)
Chr.	Chromosome 22 (human)
Band	22q11.21	Start	20,017,014 bp
Band	22q11.21	End	20,067,164 bp
RNA expression pattern
Bgee	Human / Mouse (ortholog); Top expressed in: apex of heart; granulocyte; blood; monocyte; right auricle of heart; myocardium of left ventricle; right lobe of thyroid gland; right coronary artery; left lobe of thyroid gland; spleen / n/a; More reference expression data
BioGPS	n/a
Orthologs
Databases	NCBI: entry; OMA: entry
Species	Human	Mouse
Entrez	128989	27883
Ensembl	ENSG00000183597	ENSMUSG00000013539
UniProt	Q6ICL3	P54797
RefSeq (mRNA)	NM_001283106; NM_001283116; NM_001283129; NM_001283148; NM_001283154 NM_001283179; NM_001283186; NM_001283199; NM_001283215; NM_001283235; NM_001283248; NM_152906; NM_001322141; NM_001322142; NM_001322143; NM_001322144; NM_001322145; NM_001322146; NM_001322147; NM_001322148; NM_001322149; NM_001322150; NM_001322153; NM_001322155; NM_001322160; NM_001322163; NM_001322166; NM_001322167; NM_001322169; NM_001322171; NM_001322172; NM_001322173; NM_001322174; NM_001322175	NM_138583
RefSeq (protein)	NP_001270035; NP_001270045; NP_001270058; NP_001270077; NP_001270083 NP_001270108; NP_001270115; NP_001270128; NP_001270144; NP_001270164; NP_001270177; NP_001309070; NP_001309071; NP_001309072; NP_001309073; NP_001309074; NP_001309075; NP_001309076; NP_001309077; NP_001309078; NP_001309079; NP_001309082; NP_001309084; NP_001309089; NP_001309092; NP_001309095; NP_001309096; NP_001309098; NP_001309100; NP_001309101; NP_001309102; NP_001309103; NP_001309104; NP_690870	n/a
Location (UCSC)	Chr 22: 20.02 – 20.07 Mb	n/a
PubMed search
- Wikidata
View/Edit Human	View/Edit Mouse

Transport and golgi organization 2 homolog (TANGO2) also known as chromosome 22 open reading frame 25 (C22orf25) is a protein that in humans is encoded by the TANGO2 gene.

The function of C22orf25 is not currently known. It is characterized by the NRDE superfamily domain (DUF883), which is strictly known for the conserved amino acid sequence of (N)-Asparagine (R)-Arginine (D)-Aspartic Acid (E)-Glutamic Acid. This domain is found among distantly related species from the six kingdoms: Eubacteria, Archaebacteria, Protista, Fungi, Plantae, and Animalia and is known to be involved in Golgi organization and protein secretion. It is likely that it localizes in the cytoplasm but is anchored in the cell membrane by the second amino acid. C22orf25 is also xenologous to T10 like proteins in the Fowlpox Virus and Canarypox Virus. The gene coding for C22orf25 is located on chromosome 22 and the location q11.21, so it is often associated with 22q11.2 deletion syndrome.

== Protein ==
Gene Size	Protein Size	# of exons	Promoter Sequence	Signal Peptide	Molecular Weight	Domain Length
2271 bp	276 aa	9	687 bp	No	30.9 kDa	270 aa

== Gene neighborhood ==
The C22orf25 gene is located on the long arm (q) of chromosome 22 in region 1, band 1, and sub-band 2 (22q11.21) starting at 20,008,631 base pairs and ending at 20,053,447 base pairs. There is a 1.5-3.0 Mb deletion containing around 30-40 genes, spanning this region that causes the most survivable genetic deletion disorder known as 22q11.2 deletion syndrome, which is most commonly known as DiGeorge syndrome or Velocaridofacial syndrome. 22q11.2 deletion syndrome has a vast array of phenotypes and is not attributed to the loss of a single gene. The vast phenotypes arise from deletions of not only DiGeorge Syndrome Critical Region (DGCR) genes and disease genes but other unidentified genes as well.

C22orf25 is in close proximity to DGCR8 as well as other genes known to play a part in DiGeorge Syndrome such as armadillo repeat gene deleted in Velocardiofacial syndrome (ARVCF), Cathechol-O-methyltransferase (COMT) and T-box 1 (TBX1).

Gene Neighborhood of C22orf25

== Predicted mRNA features ==
=== Promoter ===
The promoter for the C22orf25 gene spans 687 base pairs from 20,008,092 to 20,008,878 with a predicted transcriptional start site that is 104 base pairs and spans from 20,008,591 to 20,008,694. The promoter region and beginning of the C22orf25 gene (20,008,263 to 20,009,250) is not conserved past primates. This region was used to determine transcription factor interactions.

=== Transcription factors ===
Some of the main transcription factors that bind to the promoter are listed below.

Reference	Detailed Family Information	Start (amino acid)	End (amino acid)	Strand
XBBF	X-box binding factors	227	245	-
GCMF	Chorion-specific transcription factors (with a GCM DNA binding domain)	151	165	-
YBXF	Y-box binding transcription factors	158	170	-
RUSH	SWI/SNF related nucleophosphoproteins (with a RING finger binding motif)	222	232	-
NEUR	NeuroD, Beta2, HLH domain	214	226	-
PCBE	PREB core-binding element	148	162	-
NR2F	Nuclear receptor subfamily 2 factors	169	193	-
AP1R	MAF and AP1 related factors	201	221	-
ZF02	C2H2 zinc finger transcription factors 2	108	130	-
TALE	TALE homeodomain class recognizing TG motifs	216	232	-
WHNF	Winged helix transcription factors	271	281	-
FKHD	Forkhead domain factors	119	135	+
MYOD	Myoblast determining factors	218	234	+
AP1F	AP1, activating protein 1	118	130	+
BCL6	POZ domain zinc finger expressed in B cells	190	206	+
CARE	Calcium response elements	196	206	+
EVI1	EVI1 nuclear transcription factor	90	106	+
ETSF	ETS transcription factor	162	182	+
TEAF	TEA/ATTS DNA binding domain factors	176	188	+

== Expression analysis ==
Expression data from Expressed Sequence Tag mapping, microarray and in situ hybridization show high expression for Homo sapiens in the blood, bone marrow and nerves. Expression is not restricted to these areas and low expression is seen elsewhere in the body. In Caenorhabditis elegans, the snt-1 gene (C22orf25 homologue) was expressed in the nerve ring, ventral and dorsal cord processes, sites of neuromuscular junctions, and in neurons.

== Evolutionary history ==
The NRDE (DUF883) domain, is a domain of unknown function spanning majority of the C22orf25 gene and is found among distantly related species, including viruses.

Genus and Species	Common name	Accession number	Seq. Length	Seq. Identity	Seq. Similarity	Kingdom	Time of Divergence
Homo sapiens	humans	NP_690870.3	276aa	-	-	Animalia	-
Pan troglodytes	common chimpanzee	BAK62258.1	276aa	99%	100%	Animalia	6.4 mya
Ailuropoda melanoleuca	giant panda	XP_002920626	276aa	91%	94%	Animalia	94.4 mya
Mus musculus	house mouse	NP_613049.2	276aa	88%	95%	Animalia	92.4 mya
Meleagris gallopavo	turkey	XP_003210928	276aa	74%	88%	Animalia	301.7 mya
Gallus gallus	Red Junglefowl	NP_001007837	276aa	73%	88%	Animalia	301.7 mya
Xenopus laevis	African clawed frog	NP_001083694	275aa	69%	86%	Animalia	371.2 mya
Xenopus (Silurana) tropicalis	Western clawed frog	NP_001004885.1	276aa	68%	85%	Animalia	371.2 mya
Salmo salar	Atlantic salmon	NP_001167100	274aa	66%	79%	Animalia	400.1 mya
Danio rerio	zebrafish	NP_001003781	273aa	64%	78%	Animalia	400.1 mya
Canarypox	virus	NP_955117	275aa	50%	69%	-	-
Fowlpox	virus	NP_039033	273aa	44%	63%	-	-
Cupriavidus	proteobacteria	YP_002005507.1	275aa	38%	52%	Eubacteria	2313.2 mya
Burkholderia	proteobacteria	YP_004977059	273aa	37%	53%	Eubacteria	2313.2 mya
Physcomitrella patens	moss	XP_001781807	275aa	37%	54%	Plantae	1369 mya
Zea mays	maize/corn	ACG35095	266aa	33%	53%	Plantae	1369 mya
Trichophyton rubrum	fungus	XP_003236126	306aa	32%	47%	Fungi	1215.8 mya
Sporisorium reilianum	Plant pathogen	CBQ69093	321aa	32%	43%	Fungi	1215.8 mya
Perkinsus marinus	pathogen of oysters	XP_002787624	219aa	31%	48%	Protista	1381.2 mya
Tetrahymena thermophilia	Ciliate protozoa	XP_001010229	277aa	26%	44%	Protista	1381.2 mya
Natrialba magadii	extremophile	YP_003481665	300aa	25%	39%	Archaebacteria	3556.3 mya
Halopiger xanaduensis	halophilic archaeon	YP_004597780.1	264aa	24%	39%	Archaebacteria	3556.3 mya

== Predicted protein features ==
=== Post translational modifications ===
Post translational modifications of the C22orf25 gene that are evolutionarily conserved in the Animalia and Plantae kingdoms as well as the Canarypox Virus include glycosylation (C-mannosylation), glycation, phosphorylation (kinase specific), and palmitoylation.

=== Predicted topology ===
C22orf25 localizes to the cytoplasm and is anchored to the cell membrane by the second amino acid. As mentioned previously, the second amino acid is modified by palmitoylation. Palmitoylation is known to contribute to membrane association because it contributes to enhanced hydrophobicity. Palmitoylation is known to play a role in the modulation of proteins' trafficking, stability and sorting. Palmitoylation is also involved in cellular signaling and neuronal transmission.

=== Protein interactions ===
C22orf25 has been shown to interact with NFKB1, RELA, RELB, BTRC, RPS27A, BCL3, MAP3K8, NFKBIA, SIN3A, SUMO1, Tat.

== Clinical significance ==
Mutations in the TANGO2 gene may cause defects in mitochondrial β-oxidation and increased endoplasmic reticulum stress and a reduction in Golgi volume density. These mutations results in early onset hypoglycemia, hyperammonemia, rhabdomyolysis, cardiac arrhythmias, and encephalopathy that later develops into cognitive impairment. Abnormal autophagy and mitophagy have been associated with TANGO2-related disease and may explain the varying presentation in muscle biopsies, including secondary abnormal fatty acid and mitochondrial metabolism.
