= NF-κB =

Family of transcription factor protein complexes

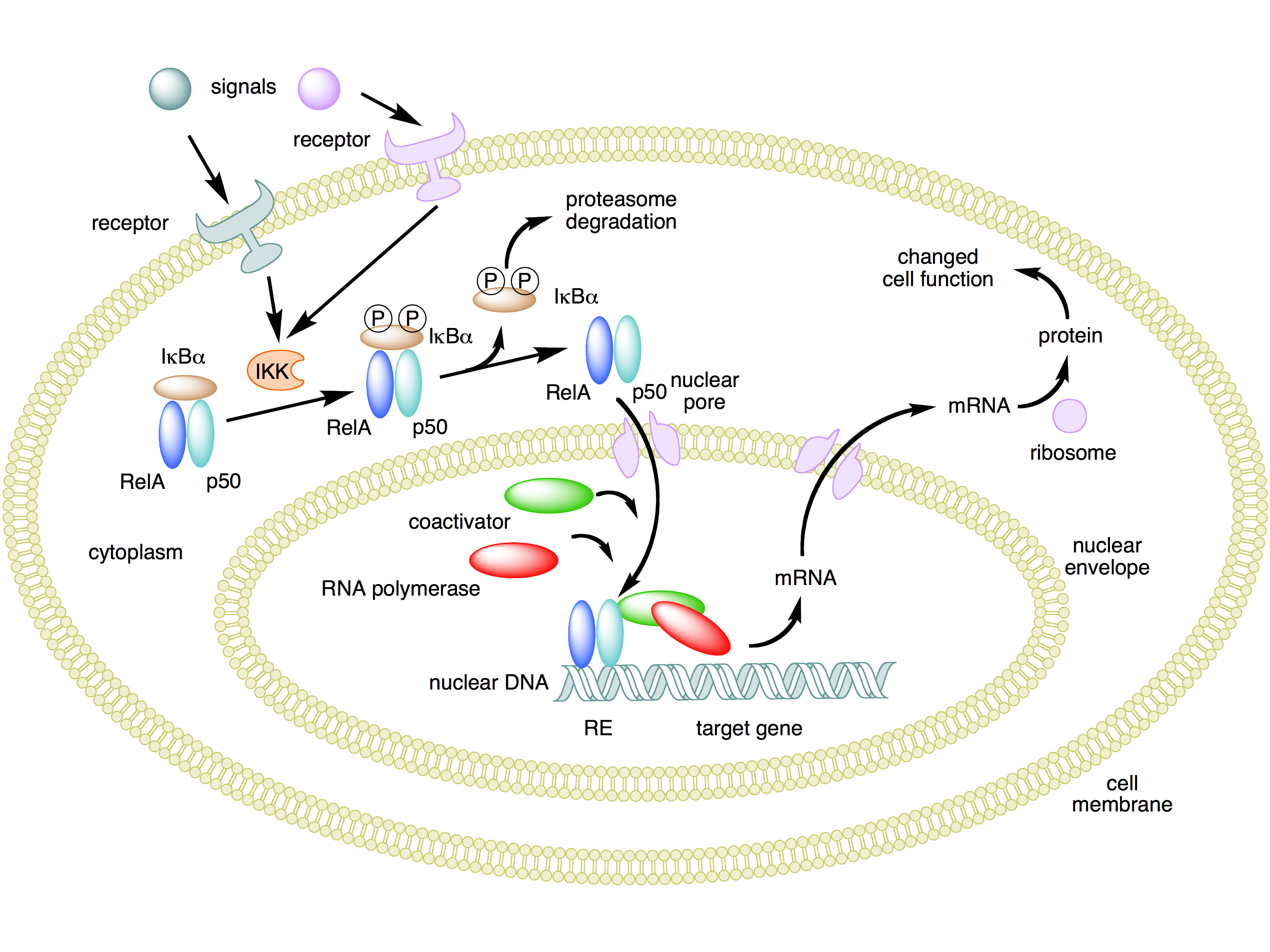
Mechanism of NF-κB action. The classic "canonical" NF-κB complex is a heterodimer of p50 and RelA, as shown. NF-κB waits for activation in the cytosol, complexed with the inhibitory protein IκBα. Various extracellular signals can enter the cell via membrane receptors and activate the enzyme IκB kinase (IKK). IKK, in turn, phosphorylates the IκBα protein, which results in ubiquitination, dissociation of IκBα from NF-κB, and eventual degradation of IκBα by the proteasome. The activated NF-κB is then translocated into the nucleus where it binds to specific sequences of DNA called response elements (RE). The DNA/NF-κB complex then recruits other proteins such as coactivators and RNA polymerase, which transcribe downstream DNA into mRNA. In turn, mRNA is translated into protein, resulting in a change of cell function.

Nuclear factor kappa-light-chain-enhancer of activated B cells (NF-κB) is a family of transcription factor protein complexes that controls transcription of DNA, cytokine production and cell survival. NF-κB is found in almost all animal cell types and is involved in cellular responses to stressful stimuli like cytokines, free radicals, heavy metals, ultraviolet irradiation, oxidized LDL, and bacterial or viral antigens. NF-κB plays a key role in regulating the immune response to infection. Incorrect regulation of NF-κB has been linked to cancer, inflammatory and autoimmune diseases, septic shock, viral infection, and improper immune development. NF-κB has also been implicated in processes of synaptic plasticity and memory.

== Discovery ==
NF-κB was discovered by Ranjan Sen in the lab of Nobel laureate David Baltimore via its interaction with an 11-base pair sequence in the immunoglobulin light-chain enhancer in B cells. Later work by Alexander Poltorak and Bruno Lemaitre in mice and Drosophila fruit flies established Toll-like receptors as universally conserved activators of NF-κB signalling. These works ultimately contributed to awarding of the 2011 Nobel Prize in Physiology or Medicine to Bruce Beutler and Jules A. Hoffmann, who were the principal investigators of those studies.

== Structure ==
All proteins of the NF-κB family share a Rel homology domain in their N-terminus. A subfamily of NF-κB proteins, including RelA, RelB, and c-Rel, have a transactivation domain in their C-termini. In contrast, the NF-κB1 and NF-κB2 proteins are synthesized as large precursors, p105 and p100, which undergo processing to generate the mature p50 and p52 subunits, respectively. The processing of p105 and p100 is mediated by the ubiquitin/proteasome pathway and involves selective degradation of their C-terminal region containing ankyrin repeats. Whereas the generation of p52 from p100 is a tightly regulated process, p50 is produced from constitutive processing of p105. The p50 and p52 proteins have no intrinsic ability to activate transcription and thus have been proposed to act as transcriptional repressors when binding κB elements as homodimers. Indeed, this confounds the interpretation of p105-knockout studies, where the genetic manipulation is removing an IκB (full-length p105) and a likely repressor (p50 homodimers) in addition to a transcriptional activator (the RelA-p50 heterodimer).

== Members ==
NF-κB family members share structural homology with the retroviral oncoprotein v-Rel, resulting in their classification as NF-κB/Rel proteins.

There are five proteins in the mammalian NF-κB family:

| Class | Protein | Aliases | Gene |
|---|---|---|---|
| I | NF-κB1 | p105 → p50 | NFKB1 |
| I | NF-κB2 | p100 → p52 | NFKB2 |
| II | RelA | p65 | RELA |
| II | RelB | | RELB |
| II | c-Rel | | REL |

The NF-κB/Rel proteins can be divided into two classes, which share general structural features:

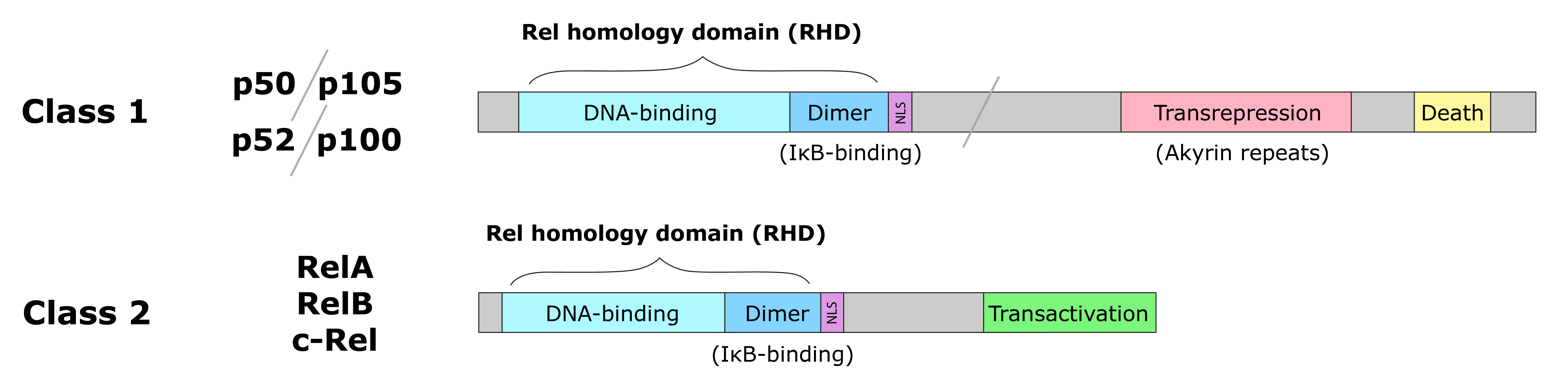
Schematic diagram of NF-κB protein structure. There are two structural classes of NF-κB proteins: class I (top) and class II (bottom). Both classes of proteins contain a N-terminal DNA-binding domain (DBD), which also serves as a dimerization interface to other NF-κB transcription factors and, in addition, binds to the inhibitory IκBα protein. The C-terminus of class I proteins contains a number of ankyrin repeats and has transrepression activity. In contrast, the C-terminus of class II proteins has a transactivation function.

Below are the five human NF-κB family members:

NFKB1
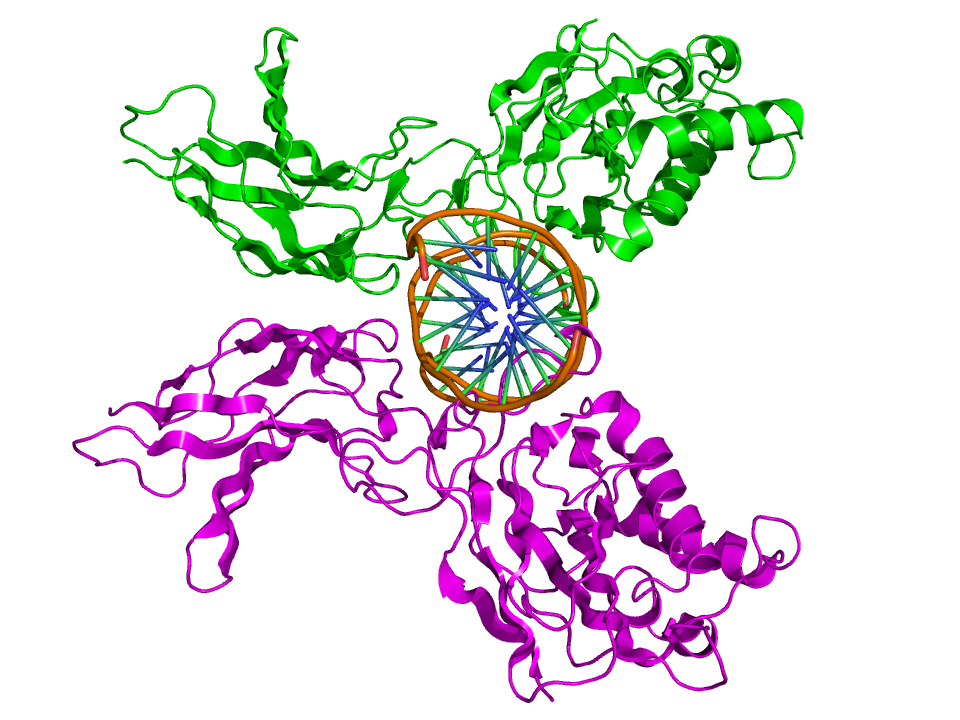
- Top view of the crystallographic structure (PDB: 1SVC) of a homodimer of the NFKB1 protein (green and magenta) bound to DNA (brown).

Identifiers
- Symbol: NFKB1
- NCBI gene: 4790
- HGNC: 7794
- OMIM: 164011
- RefSeq: NM_003998
- UniProt: P19838

Other data
- Locus: Chr. 4 q24
Search for
- Structures: Swiss-model
- Domains: InterPro

RELA
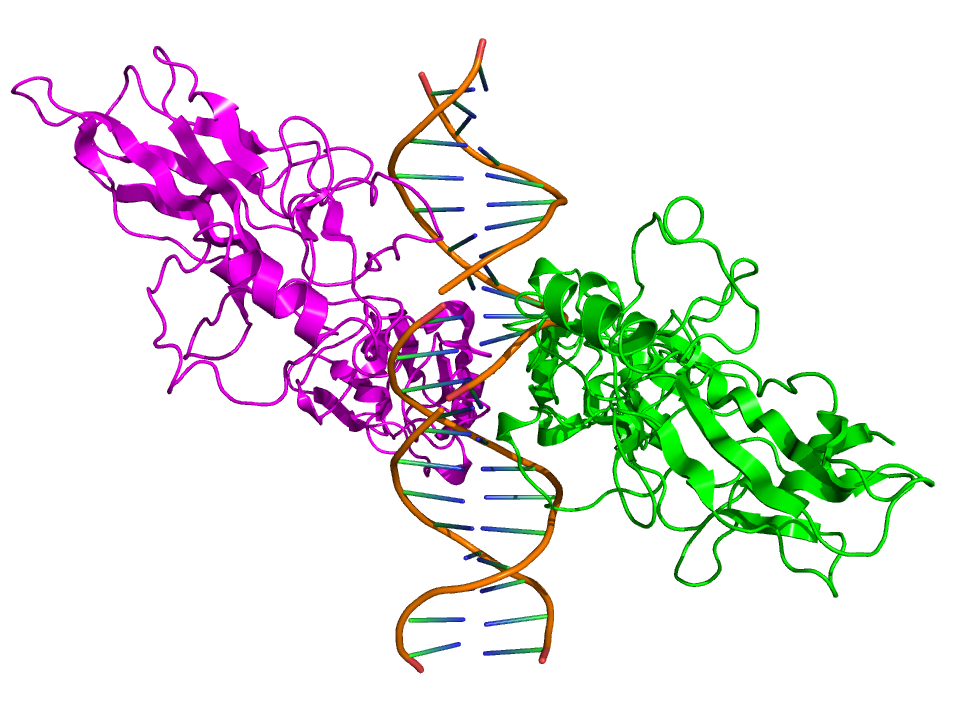
- Side view of the crystallographic structure (PDB: 2RAM) of a homodimer of the RELA protein (green and magenta) bound to DNA (brown).

Identifiers
- Symbol: RELA
- NCBI gene: 5970
- HGNC: 9955
- OMIM: 164014
- RefSeq: NM_021975
- UniProt: Q04206

Other data
- Locus: Chr. 11 q13
Search for
- Structures: Swiss-model
- Domains: InterPro

NFKB2

Identifiers
- Symbol: NFKB2
- NCBI gene: 4791
- HGNC: 7795
- OMIM: 164012
- RefSeq: NM_002502
- UniProt: Q00653

Other data
- Locus: Chr. 10 q24
Search for
- Structures: Swiss-model
- Domains: InterPro

RELB

Identifiers
- Symbol: RELB
- NCBI gene: 5971
- HGNC: 9956
- OMIM: 604758
- RefSeq: NM_006509
- UniProt: Q01201

Other data
- Locus: Chr. 19 q13.2-19q13
Search for
- Structures: Swiss-model
- Domains: InterPro

REL

Identifiers
- Symbol: REL
- NCBI gene: 5966
- HGNC: 9954
- OMIM: 164910
- RefSeq: NM_002908
- UniProt: Q04864

Other data
- Locus: Chr. 2 p13-p12
Search for
- Structures: Swiss-model
- Domains: InterPro

== Species distribution and evolution ==
In addition to mammals, NF-κB is found in a number of simple animals as well. These include cnidarians (such as sea anemones, coral and hydra), porifera (sponges), single-celled eukaryotes including Capsaspora owczarzaki and choanoflagellates, and insects (such as moths, mosquitoes and fruitflies). The sequencing of the genomes of the mosquitoes A. aegypti and A. gambiae, and the fruitfly D. melanogaster has allowed comparative genetic and evolutionary studies on NF-κB. In those insect species, activation of NF-κB is triggered by the Toll pathway (which evolved independently in insects and mammals) and by the Imd (immune deficiency) pathway.

== Signaling ==
=== Effect of activation ===
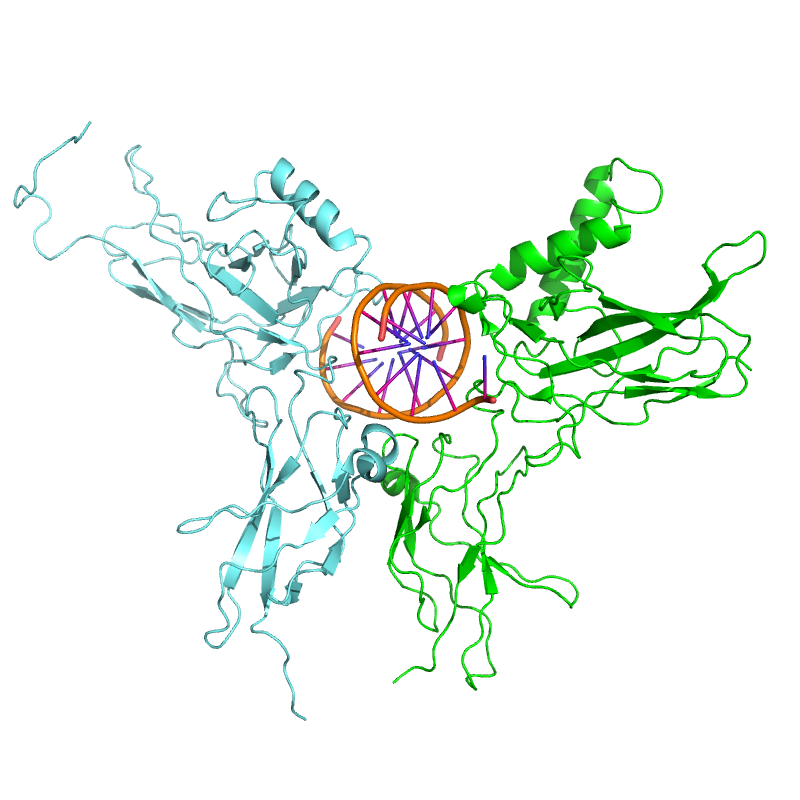
NF-κB (green) heterodimerizes with RelB (cyan) to form a ternary complex with DNA (orange) that promotes gene transcription.

NF-κB is crucial in regulating cellular responses because it belongs to the category of "rapid-acting" primary transcription factors, i.e., transcription factors that are present in cells in an inactive state and do not require new protein synthesis in order to become activated (other members of this family include transcription factors such as c-Jun, STATs, and nuclear hormone receptors). This allows NF-κB to be a first responder to harmful cellular stimuli. Known inducers of NF-κB activity are highly variable and include reactive oxygen species (ROS), tumor necrosis factor alpha (TNFα), interleukin 1-beta (IL-1β), bacterial lipopolysaccharides (LPS), isoproterenol, cocaine, endothelin-1 and ionizing radiation.

NF-κB suppression of tumor necrosis factor cytotoxicity (apoptosis) is due to induction of antioxidant enzymes and sustained suppression of c-Jun N-terminal kinases (JNKs).

Receptor activator of NF-κB (RANK), which is a type of TNFR, is a central activator of NF-κB. Osteoprotegerin (OPG), which is a decoy receptor homolog for RANK ligand (RANKL), inhibits RANK by binding to RANKL, and, thus, osteoprotegerin is tightly involved in regulating NF-κB activation.

Many bacterial products and stimulation of a wide variety of cell-surface receptors lead to NF-κB activation and fairly rapid changes in gene expression. The identification of Toll-like receptors (TLRs) as specific pattern recognition molecules and the finding that stimulation of TLRs leads to activation of NF-κB improved our understanding of how different pathogens activate NF-κB. For example, studies have identified TLR4 as the receptor for the LPS component of Gram-negative bacteria. TLRs are key regulators of both innate and adaptive immune responses.

Unlike RelA, RelB, and c-Rel, the p50 and p52 NF-κB subunits do not contain transactivation domains in their C terminal halves. Nevertheless, the p50 and p52 NF-κB members play critical roles in modulating the specificity of NF-κB function. Although homodimers of p50 and p52 are, in general, repressors of κB site transcription, both p50 and p52 participate in target gene transactivation by forming heterodimers with RelA, RelB, or c-Rel. In addition, p50 and p52 homodimers also bind to the nuclear protein Bcl-3, and such complexes can function as transcriptional activators.

=== Inhibition ===
In unstimulated cells, the NF-κB dimers are sequestered in the cytoplasm by a family of inhibitors, called IκBs (Inhibitor of κB), which are proteins that contain multiple copies of a sequence called ankyrin repeats. By virtue of their ankyrin repeat domains, the IκB proteins mask the nuclear localization signals (NLS) of NF-κB proteins and keep them sequestered in an inactive state in the cytoplasm.

IκBs are a family of related proteins that have an N-terminal regulatory domain, followed by six or more ankyrin repeats and a PEST domain near their C terminus. Although the IκB family consists of IκBα, IκBβ, IκBε, and Bcl-3, the best-studied and major IκB protein is IκBα. Due to the presence of ankyrin repeats in their C-terminal halves, p105 and p100 also function as IκB proteins. The c-terminal half of p100, that is often referred to as IκBδ, also functions as an inhibitor. IκBδ degradation in response to developmental stimuli, such as those transduced through LTβR, potentiate NF-κB dimer activation in a NIK dependent non-canonical pathway.

=== Activation process (canonical/classical) ===
Activation of the NF-κB is initiated by the signal-induced degradation of IκB proteins. This occurs primarily via activation of a kinase called the IκB kinase (IKK). IKK is composed of a heterodimer of the catalytic IKKα and IKKβ subunits and a "master" regulatory protein termed NEMO (NF-κB essential modulator) or IKKγ. When activated by signals, usually coming from the outside of the cell, the IκB kinase phosphorylates two serine residues located in an IκB regulatory domain. When phosphorylated on these serines (e.g., serines 32 and 36 in human IκBα), the IκB proteins are modified by a process called ubiquitination, which then leads them to be degraded by a cell structure called the proteasome.

With the degradation of IκB, the NF-κB complex is then freed to enter the nucleus where it can 'turn on' the expression of specific genes that have DNA-binding sites for NF-κB nearby. The activation of these genes by NF-κB then leads to the given physiological response, for example, an inflammatory or immune response, a cell survival response, or cellular proliferation. Translocation of NF-κB to nucleus can be detected immunocytochemically and measured by laser scanning cytometry. NF-κB turns on expression of its own repressor, IκBα. The newly synthesized IκBα then re-inhibits NF-κB and, thus, forms an auto feedback loop, which results in oscillating levels of NF-κB activity. In addition, several viruses, including the AIDS virus HIV, have binding sites for NF-κB that controls the expression of viral genes, which in turn contribute to viral replication or viral pathogenicity. In the case of HIV-1, activation of NF-κB may, at least in part, be involved in activation of the virus from a latent, inactive state. YopP is a factor secreted by Yersinia pestis, the causative agent of plague, that prevents the ubiquitination of IκB. This causes this pathogen to effectively inhibit the NF-κB pathway and thus block the immune response of a human infected with Yersinia.

=== Inhibitors of NF-κB activity ===
Concerning known protein inhibitors of NF-κB activity, one of them is IFRD1, which represses the activity of NF-κB p65 by enhancing the HDAC-mediated deacetylation of the p65 subunit at lysine 310, by favoring the recruitment of HDAC3 to p65. In fact IFRD1 forms trimolecular complexes with p65 and HDAC3.

The NAD^{+}-dependent protein deacetylase and longevity factor SIRT1 inhibits NF-κB gene expression by deacetylating the RelA/p65 subunit of NF-κB at lysine 310.

=== Non-canonical/alternate pathway ===
A select set of cell-differentiating or developmental stimuli, such as lymphotoxin β-receptor (LTβR), BAFF or RANKL, activate the non-canonical NF-κB pathway to induce NF-κB/RelB:p52 dimer in the nucleus. In this pathway, activation of the NF-κB inducing kinase (NIK) upon receptor ligation led to the phosphorylation and subsequent proteasomal processing of the NF-κB2 precursor protein p100 into mature p52 subunit in an IKK1/IKKa dependent manner. Then p52 dimerizes with RelB to appear as a nuclear RelB:p52 DNA binding activity. RelB:p52 regulates the expression of homeostatic lymphokines, which instructs lymphoid organogenesis and lymphocyte trafficking in the secondary lymphoid organs. In contrast to the canonical signaling that relies on NEMO-IKK2 mediated degradation of IκBα, -β, -ε, non-canonical signaling depends on NIK mediated processing of p100 into p52. Given their distinct regulations, these two pathways were thought to be independent of each other. However, it was found that syntheses of the constituents of the non-canonical pathway, viz RelB and p52, are controlled by canonical IKK2-IκB-RelA:p50 signaling. Moreover, generation of the canonical and non-canonical dimers, viz RelA:p50 and RelB:p52, within the cellular milieu are mechanistically interlinked. These analyses suggest that an integrated NF-κB system network underlies activation of both RelA and RelB containing dimer and that a malfunctioning canonical pathway will lead to an aberrant cellular response also through the non-canonical pathway. Most intriguingly, a recent study identified that TNF-induced canonical signalling subverts non-canonical RelB:p52 activity in the inflamed lymphoid tissues limiting lymphocyte ingress. Mechanistically, TNF inactivated NIK in LTβR‐stimulated cells and induced the synthesis of Nfkb2 mRNA encoding p100; these together potently accumulated unprocessed p100, which attenuated the RelB activity. A role of p100/Nfkb2 in dictating lymphocyte ingress in the inflamed lymphoid tissue may have broad physiological implications.

In addition to its traditional role in lymphoid organogenesis, the non-canonical NF-κB pathway also directly reinforces inflammatory immune responses to microbial pathogens by modulating canonical NF-κB signalling. It was shown that p100/Nfkb2 mediates stimulus-selective and cell-type-specific crosstalk between the two NF-κB pathways and that Nfkb2-mediated crosstalk protects mice from gut pathogens. On the other hand, a lack of p100-mediated regulations repositions RelB under the control of TNF-induced canonical signalling. In fact, mutational inactivation of p100/Nfkb2 in multiple myeloma enabled TNF to induce a long-lasting RelB activity, which imparted resistance in myeloma cells to chemotherapeutic drug.

=== In immunity ===
NF-κB is a major transcription factor that regulates genes responsible for both the innate and adaptive immune response. Upon activation of either the T- or B-cell receptor, NF-κB becomes activated through distinct signaling components. Upon ligation of the T-cell receptor, protein kinase Lck is recruited and phosphorylates the ITAMs of the CD3 cytoplasmic tail. ZAP70 is then recruited to the phosphorylated ITAMs and helps recruit LAT and PLC-γ, which causes activation of PKC. Through a cascade of phosphorylation events, the kinase complex is activated and NF-κB is able to enter the nucleus to upregulate genes involved in T-cell development, maturation, and proliferation.

=== In the nervous system ===
In addition to roles in mediating cell survival, studies by Mark Mattson and others have shown that NF-κB has diverse functions in the nervous system including roles in plasticity, learning, and memory. In addition to stimuli that activate NF-κB in other tissues, NF-κB in the nervous system can be activated by Growth Factors (BDNF, NGF) and synaptic transmission such as glutamate. These activators of NF-κB in the nervous system all converge upon the IKK complex and the canonical pathway.

Recently there has been a great deal of interest in the role of NF-κB in the nervous system. Current studies suggest that NF-κB is important for learning and memory in multiple organisms including crabs, fruit flies, and mice. NF-κB may regulate learning and memory in part by modulating synaptic plasticity, synapse function, as well as by regulating the growth of dendrites and dendritic spines.

Genes that have NF-κB binding sites are shown to have increased expression following learning, suggesting that the transcriptional targets of NF-κB in the nervous system are important for plasticity. Many NF-κB target genes that may be important for plasticity and learning include growth factors (BDNF, NGF) cytokines (TNF-alpha, TNFR) and kinases (PKAc).

Despite the functional evidence for a role for Rel-family transcription factors in the nervous system, it is still not clear that the neurological effects of NF-κB reflect transcriptional activation in neurons. Most manipulations and assays are performed in the mixed-cell environments found in vivo, in "neuronal" cell cultures that contain significant numbers of glia, or in tumor-derived "neuronal" cell lines. When transfections or other manipulations have been targeted specifically at neurons, the endpoints measured are typically electrophysiology or other parameters far removed from gene transcription. Careful tests of NF-κB-dependent transcription in highly purified cultures of neurons generally show little to no NF-κB activity.

Some of the reports of NF-κB in neurons appear to have been an artifact of antibody nonspecificity. Of course, artifacts of cell culture—e.g., removal of neurons from the influence of glia—could create spurious results as well. But this has been addressed in at least two co-culture approaches. Moerman et al. used a coculture format whereby neurons and glia could be separated after treatment for EMSA analysis, and they found that the NF-κB induced by glutamatergic stimuli was restricted to glia (and, intriguingly, only glia that had been in the presence of neurons for 48 hours). The same investigators explored the issue in another approach, utilizing neurons from an NF-κB reporter transgenic mouse cultured with wild-type glia; glutamatergic stimuli again failed to activate in neurons. Some of the DNA-binding activity noted under certain conditions (particularly that reported as constitutive) appears to result from Sp3 and Sp4 binding to a subset of κB enhancer sequences in neurons. This activity is actually inhibited by glutamate and other conditions that elevate intraneuronal calcium. In the final analysis, the role of NF-κB in neurons remains opaque due to the difficulty of measuring transcription in cells that are simultaneously identified for type. Certainly, learning and memory could be influenced by transcriptional changes in astrocytes and other glial elements. And it should be considered that there could be mechanistic effects of NF-κB aside from direct transactivation of genes.

== Clinical significance ==
Overview of signal transduction pathways involved in apoptosis.

=== Cancers ===
NF-κB is widely used by eukaryotic cells as a regulator of genes that control cell proliferation and cell survival. As such, many different types of human tumors have misregulated NF-κB: that is, NF-κB is constitutively active. Active NF-κB turns on the expression of genes that keep the cell proliferating and protect the cell from conditions that would otherwise cause it to die via apoptosis. In cancer, proteins that control NF-κB signaling are mutated or aberrantly expressed, leading to defective coordination between the malignant cell and the rest of the organism. This is evident both in metastasis, as well as in the inefficient eradication of the tumor by the immune system.

Normal cells can die when removed from the tissue they belong to, or when their genome cannot operate in harmony with tissue function: these events depend on feedback regulation of NF-κB, and fail in cancer.

Defects in NF-κB results in increased susceptibility to apoptosis leading to increased cell death. This is because NF-κB regulates anti-apoptotic genes especially the TRAF1 and TRAF2 and therefore abrogates the activities of the caspase family of enzymes, which are central to most apoptotic processes.

In tumor cells, NF-κB activity is enhanced, as for example, in 41% of nasopharyngeal carcinoma, colorectal cancer, prostate cancer and pancreatic tumors. This is either due to mutations in genes encoding the NF-κB transcription factors themselves or in genes that control NF-κB activity (such as IκB genes); in addition, some tumor cells secrete factors that cause NF-κB to become active. Blocking NF-κB can cause tumor cells to stop proliferating, to die, or to become more sensitive to the action of anti-tumor agents. Thus, NF-κB is the subject of much active research among pharmaceutical companies as a target for anti-cancer therapy.

However, even though convincing experimental data have identified NF-κB as a critical promoter of tumorigenesis, which creates a solid rationale for the development of antitumor therapy that is based upon suppression of NF-κB activity, caution should be exercised when considering anti-NF-κB activity as a broad therapeutic strategy in cancer treatment as data has also shown that NF-κB activity enhances tumor cell sensitivity to apoptosis and senescence. In addition, it has been shown that canonical NF-κB is a Fas transcription activator and the alternative NF-κB is a Fas transcription repressor. Therefore, NF-κB promotes Fas-mediated apoptosis in cancer cells, and thus inhibition of NF-κB may suppress Fas-mediated apoptosis to impair host immune cell-mediated tumor suppression.

=== Inflammation ===
Because NF-κB controls many genes involved in inflammation, it is not surprising that NF-κB is found to be chronically active in many inflammatory diseases, such as inflammatory bowel disease, arthritis, sepsis, gastritis, asthma, atherosclerosis and others. Elevation of some NF-κB inhibitors, such as osteoprotegerin (OPG), are associated with elevated mortality, especially from cardiovascular diseases. Elevated NF-κB has also been associated with schizophrenia. Recently, NF-κB activation has been suggested as a possible molecular mechanism for the catabolic effects of cigarette smoke in skeletal muscle and sarcopenia. Research has shown that during inflammation the function of a cell depends on signals it activates in response to contact with adjacent cells and to combinations of hormones, especially cytokines that act on it through specific receptors. A cell's phenotype within a tissue develops through mutual stimulation of feedback signals that coordinate its function with other cells; this is especially evident during reprogramming of cell function when a tissue is exposed to inflammation, because cells alter their phenotype, and gradually express combinations of genes that prepare the tissue for regeneration after the cause of inflammation is removed. Particularly important are feedback responses that develop between tissue resident cells, and circulating cells of the immune system.

Fidelity of feedback responses between diverse cell types and the immune system depends on the integrity of mechanisms that limit the range of genes activated by NF-κB, allowing only expression of genes which contribute to an effective immune response and subsequently, a complete restoration of tissue function after resolution of inflammation. In cancer, mechanisms that regulate gene expression in response to inflammatory stimuli are altered to the point that a cell ceases to link its survival with the mechanisms that coordinate its phenotype and its function with the rest of the tissue. This is often evident in severely compromised regulation of NF-κB activity, which allows cancer cells to express abnormal cohorts of NF-κB target genes. This results in not only the cancer cells functioning abnormally: cells of surrounding tissue alter their function and cease to support the organism exclusively. Additionally, several types of cells in the microenvironment of cancer may change their phenotypes to support cancer growth. Inflammation, therefore, is a process that tests the fidelity of tissue components because the process that leads to tissue regeneration requires coordination of gene expression between diverse cell types.

=== NEMO ===
NEMO deficiency syndrome is a rare genetic condition relating to a defect in IKBKG such that the NEMO scaffold protein can no longer take part in activation of NF-κB. This disease mostly affects males (because the IKBKG gene is on the X chromosome) and has a highly variable set of symptoms and prognoses.

=== Aging and obesity ===
NF-κB is increasingly expressed with obesity and aging, resulting in reduced levels of the anti-inflammatory, pro-autophagy, anti-insulin resistance protein sirtuin 1. NF-κB increases the levels of the microRNA miR-34a, which inhibits nicotinamide adenine dinucleotide (NAD) synthesis by binding to its promoter region, resulting in lower levels of sirtuin 1.

NF-κB and interleukin 1 alpha mutually induce each other in senescent cells in a positive feedback loop causing the production of senescence-associated secretory phenotype (SASP) factors. NF-κB and the NAD-degrading enzyme CD38 also mutually induce each other.

NF-κB is a central component of the cellular response to damage. NF-κB is activated in a variety of cell types that undergo normal or accelerated aging. Genetic or pharmacologic inhibition of NF-κB activation can delay the onset of numerous aging related symptoms and pathologies. This effect may be explained, in part, by the finding that reduction of NF-κB reduces the production of mitochondria-derived reactive oxygen species that can damage DNA.

=== Addiction ===
NF-κB is one of several induced transcriptional targets of ΔFosB which facilitates the development and maintenance of an addiction to a stimulus. In the caudate putamen, NF-κB induction is associated with increases in locomotion, whereas in the nucleus accumbens, NF-κB induction enhances the positive reinforcing effect of a drug through reward sensitization.

Neural and behavioral effects of validated ΔFosB transcriptional targets
| Target gene | Target expression | Neural effects | Behavioral effects |
|---|---|---|---|
| c-Fos | ↓ | Molecular switch enabling the chronic induction of ΔFosB (Note: In other words, c-Fos repression allows ΔFosB to accumulate within nucleus accumbens medium spiny neurons more rapidly because it is selectively induced in this state.) | – |
| dynorphin | ↓ (Note: ΔFosB has been implicated in causing both increases and decreases in dynorphin expression in different studies; this table entry reflects only a decrease.) | • Downregulation of κ-opioid feedback loop | • Decreased drug aversion |
| NF-κB | ↑ | • Expansion of NAcc dendritic processes • NF-κB inflammatory response in the NAcc • NF-κB inflammatory response in the CP | • Increased drug reward • Increased drug reward • Locomotor sensitization |
| GluR2 | ↑ | • Decreased sensitivity to glutamate | • Increased drug reward |
| Cdk5 | ↑ | • GluR1 synaptic protein phosphorylation • Expansion of NAcc dendritic processes | Decreased drug reward (net effect) |

== Non-drug inhibitors ==
Many natural products (including anti-oxidants) that have been promoted to have anti-cancer and anti-inflammatory activity have also been shown to inhibit NF-κB. There is a controversial US patent (US patent 6,410,516) that applies to the discovery and use of agents that can block NF-κB for therapeutic purposes. This patent is involved in several lawsuits, including Ariad v. Lilly. Recent work by Karin, Ben-Neriah and others has highlighted the importance of the connection between NF-κB, inflammation, and cancer, and underscored the value of therapies that regulate the activity of NF-κB.

Extracts from a number of herbs and dietary plants are efficient inhibitors of NF-κB activation in vitro. Nobiletin, a flavonoid isolated from citrus peels, has been shown to inhibit the NF-κB signaling pathway in mice. Likewise, various withanolides of Withania somnifera (Ashwagandha) have been found to have inhibiting effects on NF-κB through inhibition of proteasome mediated ubiquitin degradation of IκBα.

== As a drug target ==
Aberrant activation of NF-κB is frequently observed in many cancers. Moreover, suppression of NF-κB limits the proliferation of cancer cells. In addition, NF-κB is a key player in the inflammatory response. Hence methods of inhibiting NF-κB signaling has potential therapeutic application in cancer and inflammatory diseases.

Both the canonical and non-canonical NF-κB pathways require proteasomal degradation of regulatory pathway components for NF-κB signalling to occur. The proteosome inhibitor Bortezomib broadly blocks this activity and is approved for treatment of NF-κB driven Mantle Cell Lymphoma and Multiple Myeloma.

The discovery that activation of NF-κB nuclear translocation can be separated from the elevation of oxidant stress gives a promising avenue of development for strategies targeting NF-κB inhibition.

The drug denosumab acts to raise bone mineral density and reduce fracture rates in many patient sub-groups by inhibiting RANKL. RANKL acts through its receptor RANK, which in turn promotes NF-κB, RANKL normally works by enabling the differentiation of osteoclasts from monocytes.

Disulfiram, olmesartan and dithiocarbamates can inhibit the NF-κB signaling cascade. Effort to develop direct NF-κB inhibitor has emerged with compounds such as (-)-DHMEQ, PBS-1086, IT-603 and IT-901. (-)-DHMEQ and PBS-1086 are irreversible binder to NF-κB while IT-603 and IT-901 are reversible binder. DHMEQ covalently binds to Cys 38 of p65.

Anatabine's antiinflammatory effects are claimed to result from modulation of NF-κB activity. However the studies purporting its benefit use abnormally high doses in the millimolar range (similar to the extracellular potassium concentration), which are unlikely to be achieved in humans.

BAY 11-7082 has also been identified as a drug that can inhibit the NF-κB signaling cascade. It is capable of preventing the phosphorylation of IKK-α in an irreversible manner such that there is down regulation of NF-κB activation.

It has been shown that administration of BAY 11-7082 rescued renal functionality in diabetic-induced Sprague-Dawley rats by suppressing NF-κB regulated oxidative stress.

Research has shown that the N-acylethanolamine, palmitoylethanolamide is capable of PPAR-mediated inhibition of NF-κB.

The biological target of iguratimod, a drug marketed to treat rheumatoid arthritis in Japan and China, was unknown as of 2015, but the primary mechanism of action appeared to be preventing NF-κB activation.

== See also ==
- IKK2
- RELA
- TNF receptor superfamily
- Imd pathway
