= BCL3 =

Protein-coding gene in humans

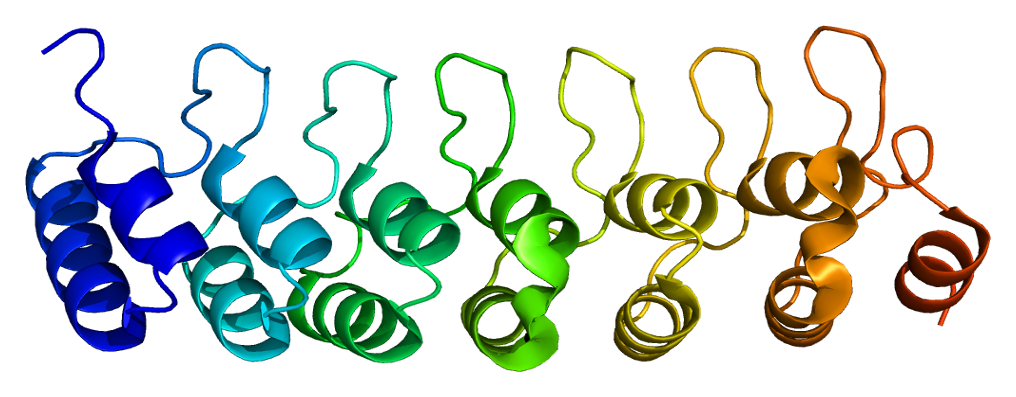

Identifiers
- Aliases: BCL3, BCL4, D19S37, B-cell CLL/lymphoma 3, B cell CLL/lymphoma 3, transcription coactivator, BCL3 transcription coactivator
- External IDs: OMIM: 109560; MGI: 88140; GeneCards: BCL3
Available structures
PDB	Ortholog search: PDBe RCSB
PDB	List of PDB id codes 1K1A, 1K1B

Gene location (Human)
Chr.	Chromosome 19 (human)
Band	19q13.32	Start	44,747,705 bp
Band	19q13.32	End	44,760,044 bp

Gene location (Mouse)
Chr.	Chromosome 7 (mouse)
Band	7 A3|7 9.95 cM	Start	19,542,387 bp
Band	7 A3|7 9.95 cM	End	19,556,695 bp
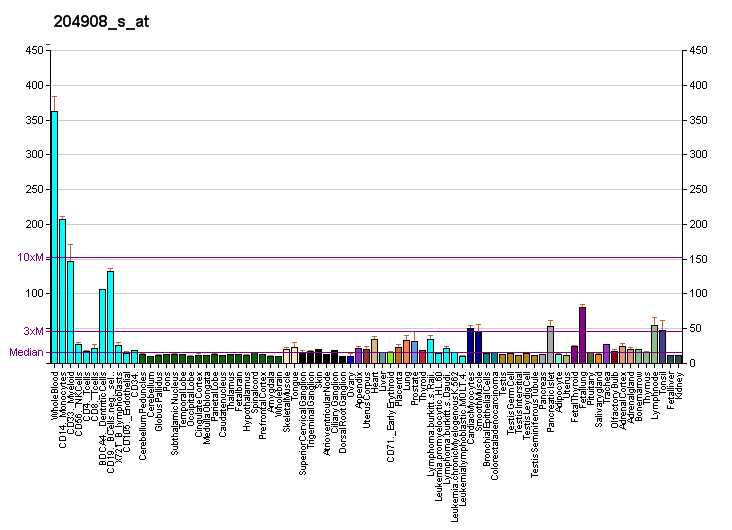

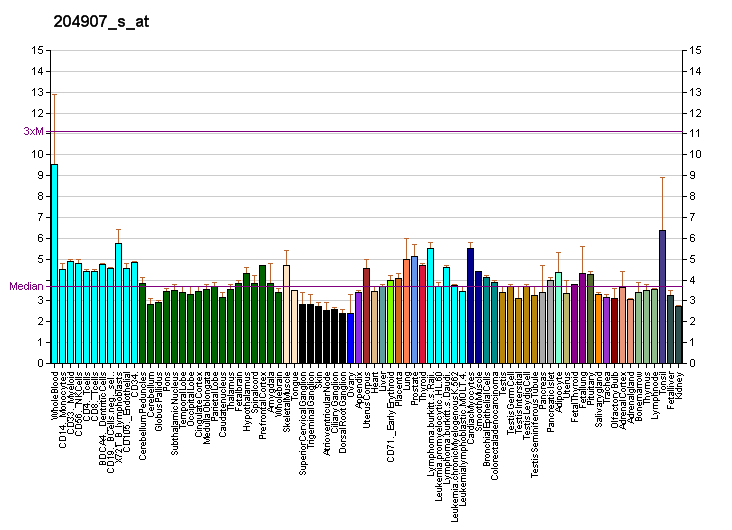
RNA expression pattern
Bgee	Human / Mouse (ortholog); Top expressed in: left uterine tube; right lobe of liver; upper lobe of left lung; gastric mucosa; mucosa of transverse colon; spleen; apex of heart; olfactory zone of nasal mucosa; left adrenal cortex; right lung / Top expressed in: lumbar spinal ganglion; granulocyte; mesenteric lymph nodes; intestinal villus; jejunum; left lobe of liver; duodenum; colon; ileum; ankle joint; More reference expression data
BioGPS	More reference expression data
Gene ontology
Molecular function	DNA binding; protein-macromolecule adaptor activity; DNA-binding transcription factor activity; transcription factor binding; protein binding
Cellular component	cytoplasm; Bcl3-Bcl10 complex; nucleoplasm; perinuclear region of cytoplasm; Bcl3/NF-kappaB2 complex; nucleus; cytosol; plasma membrane; midbody; intracellular membrane-bounded organelle; protein-containing complex
Biological process	regulation of apoptotic process; intrinsic apoptotic signaling pathway in response to DNA damage by p53 class mediator; regulation of DNA binding; regulation of transcription, DNA-templated; T-helper 2 cell differentiation; antimicrobial humoral response; germinal center formation; response to virus; DNA damage response, signal transduction by p53 class mediator; extracellular matrix organization; positive regulation of interferon-gamma production; negative regulation of apoptotic process; spleen development; marginal zone B cell differentiation; positive regulation of translation; transcription, DNA-templated; cellular response to DNA damage stimulus; positive regulation of transcription, DNA-templated; humoral immune response mediated by circulating immunoglobulin; follicular dendritic cell differentiation; defense response to bacterium; T-helper 1 type immune response; negative regulation of transcription, DNA-templated; I-kappaB kinase/NF-kappaB signaling; response to UV-C; maintenance of protein location in nucleus; positive regulation of transcription by RNA polymerase II; defense response to protozoan; negative regulation of receptor signaling pathway via JAK-STAT; regulation of NIK/NF-kappaB signaling
Sources:Amigo / QuickGO
Orthologs
Databases	NCBI: entry; OMA: entry
Species	Human	Mouse
Entrez	602	12051
Ensembl	ENSG00000069399	ENSMUSG00000053175
UniProt	P20749	Q9Z2F6
RefSeq (mRNA)	NM_005178	NM_033601
RefSeq (protein)	NP_005169	NP_291079
Location (UCSC)	Chr 19: 44.75 – 44.76 Mb	Chr 7: 19.54 – 19.56 Mb
PubMed search
- Wikidata
View/Edit Human	View/Edit Mouse

B-cell lymphoma 3-encoded protein is a protein that in humans is encoded by the BCL3 gene.

This gene is a proto-oncogene candidate. It is identified by its translocation into the immunoglobulin alpha-locus in some cases of B-cell leukemia. The protein encoded by this gene contains seven ankyrin repeats, which are most closely related to those found in I kappa B proteins. This protein functions as a transcriptional coactivator that activates through its association with NF-kappa B homodimers. The expression of this gene can be induced by NF-kappa B, which forms a part of the autoregulatory loop that controls the nuclear residence of p50 NF-kappa B.

Like BCL2, BCL5, BCL6, BCL7A, BCL9, and BCL10, it has clinical significance in lymphoma.

== Interactions ==
BCL3 has been shown to interact with:

- BARD1,
- C-Fos,
- C-jun,
- C22orf25,
- COPS5,
- EP300,
- HTATIP,
- NFKB1,
- NFKB2,
- PIR, and
- NR2B1.

== Clinical significance ==
Genetic variations in BCL3 gene have been associated with late-onset Alzheimer's disease (LOAD) and chronic lymphocytic leukemia. β-amyloid accumulation in neurons of Alzheimer's patients results in activation of NF-κB, which induces BCL3 expression. Increased expression of BCL3 has been observed in the brains of patients with LOAD.

The role of Bcl3 in solid tumors was established through the ability of Bcl3 to promote metastasis without affecting primary tumor growth or normal mammary function, within models of ErbB2-positive breast cancer. Further research has uncovered the role of Bcl3 in promoting progression of other solid tumors. The role of Bcl3 in promoting tumor hallmarks has been most widely reported for advanced colorectal cancer; where Bcl3 expression is up-regulated in >30% of colorectal cancer cases and is associated with a poor prognosis. For example, in colorectal cancer models, elevated Bcl3 expression was found to activate AKT signalling, drive a cancer stem cell phenotype through enhancing β-catenin signalling, drive the COX-2 mediated response to inflammatory cytokines, and protect colorectal tumor cells against DNA damage. The role of Bcl3 in enabling multiple cancer hallmarks in colorectal carcinogenesis has been reviewed.

More recently other cancer cell signalling pathways have been shown to be modulated by Bcl3. These include Wnt/beta-catenin through direct protein interaction; Smad3, through an unknown mechanism of protein stabilisation and transcriptional regulation of Stat3. Other pathways influenced by Bcl3 activity include phosphorylation of AKT through an unknown mechanism.

== Role in cancer therapy ==
Bcl3 also influences responses of cancer cells to treatment. Bcl3 promotes resistance to alkylating chemotherapy in gliomas, DNA damaging agents in colorectal cancer, and regulates the cancer immune checkpoint control gene PD-L1 in ovarian cancer cells.

The first discovery of a small molecule anti-metastatic Bcl3 inhibitor was reported utilising a virtual drug design and screening approach, targeting the protein-protein interaction between Bcl3 and partner protein p50. The virtual screening hit compound showed potent intracellular Bcl3-inhibitory activity, and led to reductions in NF-κB signalling, tumor colony formation and cancer cell migration within in vitro cellular models of breast cancer. In vivo inhibition of tumor growth and anti-metastatic activity was observed in invasive breast cancer models, without overt systemic toxicity.

== Development ==
TNA Therapeutics, is the only company engaged in developing a BCL3 inhibitor. TNAT-101, is an orally bioavailable, small molecule inhibitor of the novel target BCL3. BCL3 is a transcriptional regulator of multiple pathways critical for cancer initiation, maintenance and progression. It plays an important role in tumor growth, cell death, migration, metastasis and cancer stem cell viability.

https://www.tnatherapeutics.com/
