= NFKB1 =

Protein-coding gene in humans

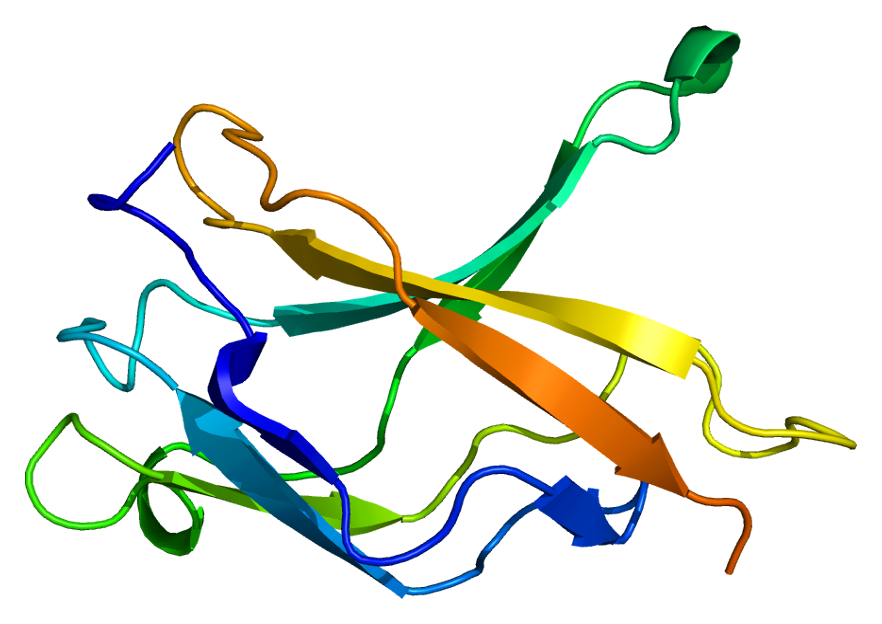

Identifiers
- Aliases: NFKB1, EBP-1, KBF1, NF-kB1, NF-kappa-B, NF-kappaB, NFKB-p105, NFKB-p50, NFkappaB, p105, p50, CVID12, nuclear factor kappa B subunit 1, NF-kappa-B1, NF-kB, NF-kappabeta
- External IDs: OMIM: 164011; MGI: 97312; GeneCards: NFKB1
Available structures
PDB	Ortholog search: PDBe RCSB
PDB	List of PDB id codes 1MDI, 1MDJ, 1MDK, 1NFI, 1SVC, 2DBF, 2O61, 3GUT

Gene location (Human)
Chr.	Chromosome 4 (human)
Band	4q24	Start	102,501,331 bp
Band	4q24	End	102,617,302 bp

Gene location (Mouse)
Chr.	Chromosome 3 (mouse)
Band	3 G3|3 62.82 cM	Start	135,290,416 bp
Band	3 G3|3 62.82 cM	End	135,397,308 bp
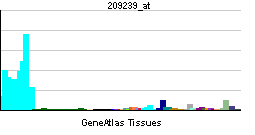
RNA expression pattern
Bgee	Human / Mouse (ortholog); Top expressed in: cartilage tissue; Achilles tendon; monocyte; appendix; epithelium of colon; gallbladder; bone marrow cell; rectum; middle frontal gyrus; blood / Top expressed in: granulocyte; spleen; thymus; lactiferous gland; lymph node; lip; otic vesicle; Ileal epithelium; right lung; gastrula; More reference expression data
BioGPS	More reference expression data
Gene ontology
Molecular function	DNA-binding transcription factor activity; RNA polymerase II transcription regulatory region sequence-specific DNA binding; transcription factor binding; DNA-binding transcription activator activity, RNA polymerase II-specific; DNA-binding transcription repressor activity, RNA polymerase II-specific; RNA polymerase II cis-regulatory region sequence-specific DNA binding; protein homodimerization activity; chromatin binding; protein binding; DNA binding; sequence-specific DNA binding; actinin binding; identical protein binding; transcription cis-regulatory region binding; protein heterodimerization activity; DNA-binding transcription factor activity, RNA polymerase II-specific
Cellular component	cytoplasm; mitochondrion; nucleus; I-kappaB/NF-kappaB complex; nucleoplasm; extracellular region; cytosol; secretory granule lumen; specific granule lumen
Biological process	cellular response to interleukin-6; positive regulation of canonical Wnt signaling pathway; regulation of transcription by RNA polymerase II; transcription by RNA polymerase II; negative regulation of vitamin D biosynthetic process; Fc-epsilon receptor signaling pathway; cellular response to mechanical stimulus; NIK/NF-kappaB signaling; stress-activated MAPK cascade; negative regulation of inflammatory response; apoptotic process; response to muscle stretch; regulation of transcription, DNA-templated; stimulatory C-type lectin receptor signaling pathway; transcription, DNA-templated; positive regulation of transcription, DNA-templated; negative regulation of calcidiol 1-monooxygenase activity; positive regulation of hyaluronan biosynthetic process; membrane protein intracellular domain proteolysis; inflammatory response; I-kappaB kinase/NF-kappaB signaling; positive regulation of miRNA metabolic process; cellular response to nicotine; negative regulation of transcription by RNA polymerase II; positive regulation of macrophage derived foam cell differentiation; positive regulation of NF-kappaB transcription factor activity; negative regulation of cholesterol transport; negative regulation of transcription, DNA-templated; negative regulation of cytokine production; positive regulation of lipid storage; cellular response to dsRNA; T cell receptor signaling pathway; positive regulation of type I interferon production; positive regulation of transcription by RNA polymerase II; signal transduction; cellular response to lipopolysaccharide; cellular response to interleukin-1; innate immune response; negative regulation of apoptotic process; negative regulation of gene expression; neutrophil degranulation; cellular response to tumor necrosis factor; cellular response to angiotensin; interleukin-1-mediated signaling pathway
Sources:Amigo / QuickGO
Orthologs
Databases	NCBI: entry; OMA: entry
Species	Human	Mouse
Entrez	4790	18033
Ensembl	ENSG00000109320	ENSMUSG00000028163
UniProt	P19838	P25799
RefSeq (mRNA)	NM_001165412; NM_003998; NM_001319226; NM_001382625; NM_001382626 NM_001382627; NM_001382628	NM_008689
RefSeq (protein)	NP_001158884; NP_001306155; NP_003989; NP_001369554; NP_001369555 NP_001369556; NP_001369557; NP_001158884.1; NP_001306155.1	NP_032715
Location (UCSC)	Chr 4: 102.5 – 102.62 Mb	Chr 3: 135.29 – 135.4 Mb
PubMed search
- Wikidata
View/Edit Human	View/Edit Mouse

Nuclear factor NF-kappa-B p105 subunit is a protein that in humans is encoded by the NFKB1 gene.

This gene encodes a 105 kD protein which can undergo cotranslational processing by the 26S proteasome to produce a 50 kD protein. The 105 kD protein is a Rel protein-specific transcription inhibitor and the 50 kD protein is a DNA binding subunit of the NF-kappaB (NF-κB) protein complex. NF-κB is a transcription factor that is activated by various intra- and extra-cellular stimuli such as cytokines, oxidant-free radicals, ultraviolet irradiation, and bacterial or viral products. Activated NF-κB translocates into the nucleus and stimulates the expression of genes involved in a wide variety of biological functions; over 200 known genes are targets of NF-κB in various cell types, under specific conditions. Inappropriate activation of NF-κB has been associated with a number of inflammatory diseases while persistent inhibition of NF-κB leads to inappropriate immune cell development or delayed cell growth.

== Interactions ==
NFKB1 has been shown to interact with:

- BCL3,
- C22orf25,
- HDAC1,
- HMGA2
- IKK2,
- ITGB3BP,
- IκBα,
- LYL1,
- MAP3K7IP2,
- MAP3K8,
- MEN1,
- NFKB2,
- NFKBIE,
- NOTCH1,
- Nuclear receptor coactivator 1,
- RELA,
- RELB,
- STAT3,
- STAT6, and
- TSC22D3.
