= NFKBIB =

Protein-coding gene in the species Homo sapiens

Identifiers
- Aliases: NFKBIB, IKBB, TRIP9, NFKB inhibitor beta
- External IDs: OMIM: 604495; MGI: 104752; GeneCards: NFKBIB
Available structures
PDB	Ortholog search: PDBe RCSB
PDB	List of PDB id codes 1K3Z, 1OY3

Gene location (Human)
Chr.	Chromosome 19 (human)
Band	19q13.2	Start	38,899,700 bp
Band	19q13.2	End	38,908,893 bp

Gene location (Mouse)
Chr.	Chromosome 7 (mouse)
Band	7|7 B1	Start	28,457,676 bp
Band	7|7 B1	End	28,466,937 bp
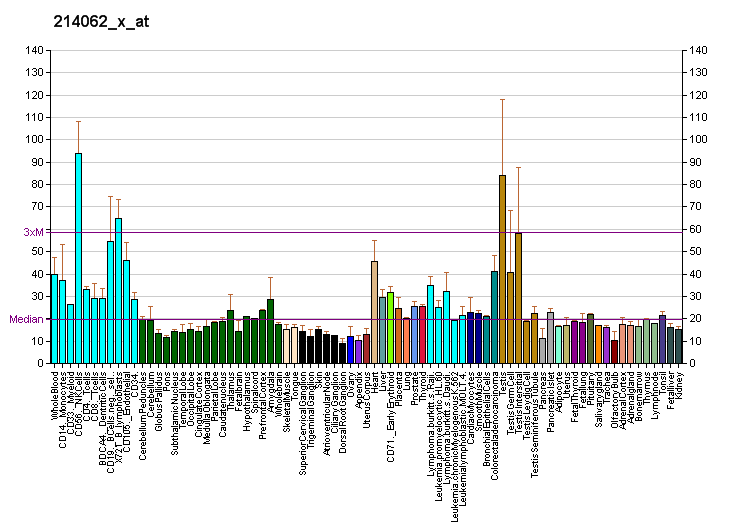

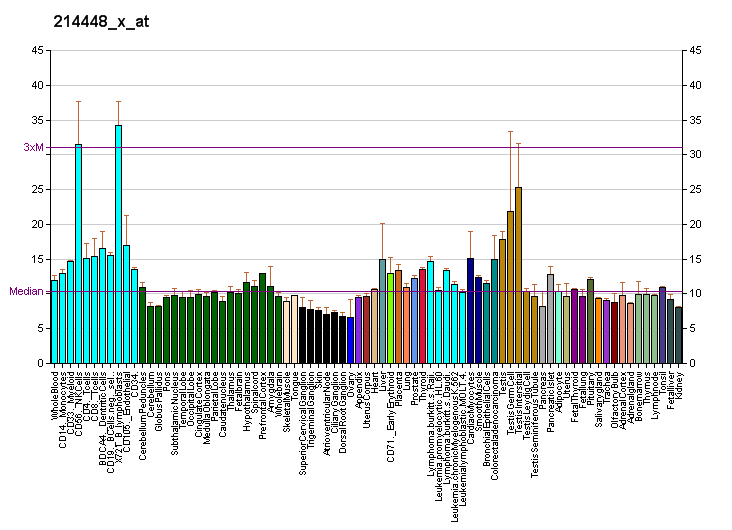
RNA expression pattern
Bgee	Human / Mouse (ortholog); Top expressed in: left testis; right testis; granulocyte; gastrocnemius muscle; C1 segment; mucosa of transverse colon; blood; substantia nigra; right lobe of liver; putamen / Top expressed in: seminiferous tubule; muscle of thigh; granulocyte; right kidney; embryo; embryo; lip; yolk sac; ankle; secondary oocyte; More reference expression data
BioGPS	More reference expression data
Gene ontology
Molecular function	signal transducer activity; transcription coactivator activity; protein binding
Cellular component	cytoplasm; nucleus; cytosol
Biological process	transcription, DNA-templated; cellular response to lipopolysaccharide; signal transduction; positive regulation of nucleic acid-templated transcription
Sources:Amigo / QuickGO
Orthologs
Databases	NCBI: entry; OMA: entry
Species	Human	Mouse
Entrez	4793	18036
Ensembl	ENSG00000104825; ENSG00000282905	ENSMUSG00000030595
UniProt	Q15653	Q60778
RefSeq (mRNA)	NM_001001716; NM_001243116; NM_002503; NM_001369699; NM_001369700	NM_010908; NM_001306222
RefSeq (protein)	NP_001230045; NP_002494; NP_001356628; NP_001356629	NP_001293151; NP_035038
Location (UCSC)	Chr 19: 38.9 – 38.91 Mb	Chr 7: 28.46 – 28.47 Mb
PubMed search
- Wikidata
View/Edit Human	View/Edit Mouse

NF-kappa-B inhibitor beta is a protein that in humans is encoded by the NFKBIB gene.

== Function ==
NFKB1 (MIM 164011) or NFKB2 (MIM 164012) is bound to REL (MIM 164910), RELA (MIM 164014), or RELB (MIM 604758) to form the NFKB complex. The NFKB complex is inhibited by I-kappa-B proteins (NFKBIA, MIM 164008, or NFKBIB), which inactivate NF-kappa-B by trapping it in the cytoplasm. Phosphorylation of serine residues on the I-kappa-B proteins by kinases (IKBKA, MIM 600664 or IKBKB, MIM 603258) marks them for destruction via the ubiquitination pathway, thereby allowing activation of the NF-kappa-B complex. Activated NFKB complex translocates into the nucleus and binds DNA at kappa-B-binding motifs such as 5-prime GGGRNNYYCC 3-prime or 5-prime HGGARNYYCC 3-prime (where H is A, C, or T; R is an A or G purine; and Y is a C or T pyrimidine).[supplied by OMIM]

== Interactions ==
NFKBIB has been shown to interact with:

- IKK2,
- RELA, and
- Retinoid X receptor alpha.
