= REL =

Protein-coding gene in the species Homo sapiens

Identifiers
- Aliases: REL, C-Rel, REL proto-oncogene, NF-kB subunit, HIVEN86A, IMD92
- External IDs: OMIM: 164910; MGI: 97897; GeneCards: REL

Gene location (Human)
Chr.	Chromosome 2 (human)
Band	2p16.1	Start	60,881,521 bp
Band	2p16.1	End	60,931,612 bp

Gene location (Mouse)
Chr.	Chromosome 11 (mouse)
Band	11 A3.2|11 14.36 cM	Start	23,686,847 bp
Band	11 A3.2|11 14.36 cM	End	23,720,970 bp
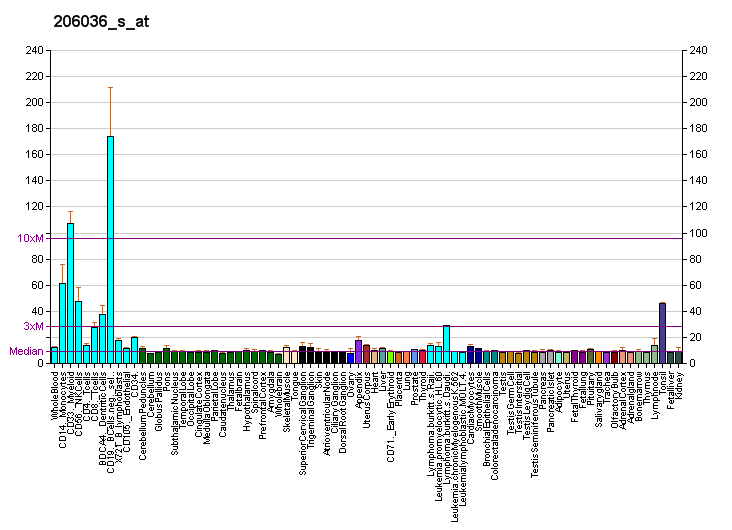
RNA expression pattern
Bgee	Human / Mouse (ortholog); Top expressed in: buccal mucosa cell; bone marrow; secondary oocyte; bone marrow cell; monocyte; epithelium of colon; mucosa of urinary bladder; human penis; cartilage tissue; superficial temporal artery / Top expressed in: mesenteric lymph nodes; blood; spleen; granulocyte; conjunctival fornix; skin of external ear; bone marrow; secondary oocyte; cumulus cell; stroma of bone marrow; More reference expression data
BioGPS	More reference expression data
Gene ontology
Molecular function	RNA polymerase II cis-regulatory region sequence-specific DNA binding; DNA binding; sequence-specific DNA binding; chromatin binding; DNA-binding transcription activator activity, RNA polymerase II-specific; protein binding; DNA-binding transcription factor activity; DNA-binding transcription factor activity, RNA polymerase II-specific; RNA polymerase II transcription regulatory region sequence-specific DNA binding
Cellular component	cytoplasm; cytosol; I-kappaB/NF-kappaB complex; transcription regulator complex; nucleoplasm; nucleus
Biological process	response to cytokine; regulation of transcription, DNA-templated; negative regulation of transcription by RNA polymerase II; negative regulation of interferon-beta production; negative regulation of gene expression; transcription, DNA-templated; positive regulation of transcription, DNA-templated; NIK/NF-kappaB signaling; positive regulation of I-kappaB kinase/NF-kappaB signaling; innate immune response; inflammatory response; positive regulation of transcription by RNA polymerase II; negative regulation of neuron death; I-kappaB kinase/NF-kappaB signaling; transcription by RNA polymerase II
Sources:Amigo / QuickGO
Orthologs
Databases	NCBI: entry; OMA: entry
Species	Human	Mouse
Entrez	5966	19696
Ensembl	ENSG00000162924	ENSMUSG00000020275
UniProt	Q04864	P15307
RefSeq (mRNA)	NM_001291746; NM_002908	NM_009044
RefSeq (protein)	NP_001278675; NP_002899	NP_033070
Location (UCSC)	Chr 2: 60.88 – 60.93 Mb	Chr 11: 23.69 – 23.72 Mb
PubMed search
- Wikidata
View/Edit Human	View/Edit Mouse

The proto-oncogene c-Rel is a protein that in humans is encoded by the REL gene. The c-Rel protein is a member of the NF-κB family of transcription factors and contains a Rel homology domain (RHD) at its N-terminus and two C-terminal transactivation domains. c-Rel is a myeloid checkpoint protein that can be targeted for treating cancer. c-Rel has an important role in B-cell survival and proliferation. The REL gene is amplified or mutated in several human B-cell lymphomas, including diffuse large B-cell lymphoma and Hodgkin's lymphoma.
