= RELB =

Protein-coding gene in the species Homo sapiens

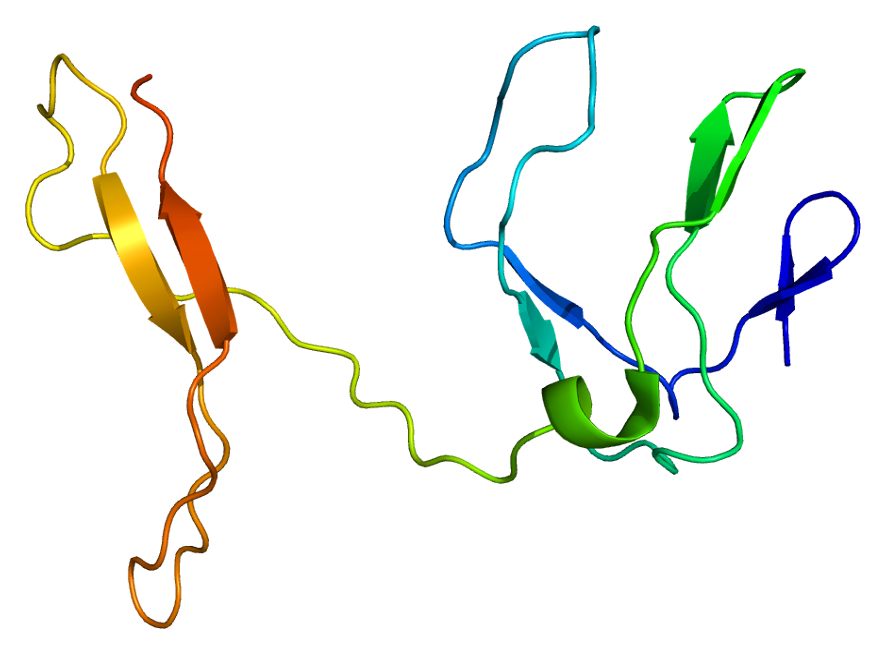

Identifiers
- Aliases: RELB, I-REL, IREL, REL-B, RELB proto-oncogene, NF-kB subunit, IMD53
- External IDs: OMIM: 604758; MGI: 103289; GeneCards: RELB
Available structures
PDB	Ortholog search: PDBe RCSB
PDB	List of PDB id codes 1ZK9, 1ZKA, 2V2T, 3DO7, 3JSS, 3JUZ, 3JV0, 3JV4, 3JV6, 4JGM, 4JHB

Gene location (Human)
Chr.	Chromosome 19 (human)
Band	19q13.32	Start	45,001,449 bp
Band	19q13.32	End	45,038,198 bp

Gene location (Mouse)
Chr.	Chromosome 7 (mouse)
Band	7 A3|7 9.93 cM	Start	19,340,142 bp
Band	7 A3|7 9.93 cM	End	19,363,363 bp
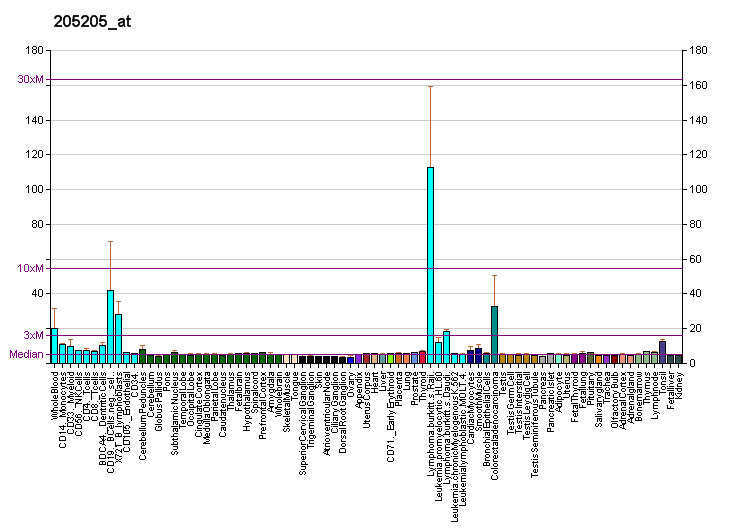
RNA expression pattern
Bgee	Human / Mouse (ortholog); Top expressed in: granulocyte; mucosa of transverse colon; cartilage tissue; monocyte; spleen; olfactory zone of nasal mucosa; blood; upper lobe of left lung; stromal cell of endometrium; muscle of thigh / Top expressed in: mesenteric lymph nodes; jejunum; intestinal villus; granulocyte; spleen; duodenum; lactiferous gland; colon; left colon; thymus; More reference expression data
BioGPS	More reference expression data
Gene ontology
Molecular function	DNA binding; RNA polymerase II transcription regulatory region sequence-specific DNA binding; transcription corepressor activity; DNA-binding transcription factor activity; chromatin binding; protein binding; protein kinase binding; identical protein binding; DNA-binding transcription factor activity, RNA polymerase II-specific; RNA polymerase II cis-regulatory region sequence-specific DNA binding
Cellular component	I-kappaB/NF-kappaB complex; nucleoplasm; microtubule organizing center; cytoskeleton; nucleus; cytoplasm; cytosol; centrosome; protein-containing complex; transcription repressor complex
Biological process	response to cytokine; antigen processing and presentation; regulation of transcription, DNA-templated; rhythmic process; regulation of transcription by RNA polymerase II; myeloid dendritic cell differentiation; stimulatory C-type lectin receptor signaling pathway; negative regulation of transcription by RNA polymerase II; T-helper 1 cell differentiation; negative regulation of interferon-beta production; circadian regulation of gene expression; transcription, DNA-templated; cellular response to osmotic stress; positive regulation of gene expression; NIK/NF-kappaB signaling; T-helper 1 type immune response; inflammatory response; negative regulation of transcription, DNA-templated; I-kappaB kinase/NF-kappaB signaling; positive regulation of transcription by RNA polymerase II; innate immune response; lymphocyte differentiation
Sources:Amigo / QuickGO
Orthologs
Databases	NCBI: entry; OMA: entry
Species	Human	Mouse
Entrez	5971	19698
Ensembl	ENSG00000104856	ENSMUSG00000002983
UniProt	Q01201	Q04863
RefSeq (mRNA)	NM_006509	NM_001290457; NM_009046
RefSeq (protein)	NP_006500	NP_001277386; NP_033072
Location (UCSC)	Chr 19: 45 – 45.04 Mb	Chr 7: 19.34 – 19.36 Mb
PubMed search
- Wikidata
View/Edit Human	View/Edit Mouse

Transcription factor RelB is a protein that in humans is encoded by the RELB gene.

== Interactions ==
RELB has been shown to interact with NFKB2, NFKB1, and C22orf25.

== Activation and function ==
In resting cells, RelB is sequestered by the NF-κB precursor protein p100 in the cytoplasm. A select set of TNF-R superfamily members, including lymphotoxin β-receptor (LTβR), BAFF-R, CD40 and RANK, activate the non-canonical NF-κB pathway. In this pathway, NIK stimulates the processing of p100 into p52, which in association with RelB appears in the nucleus as RelB:p52 NF-κB heterodimers. RelB:p52 activates the expression homeostatic lymphokines, which instruct lymphoid organogenesis and determine the trafficking of naive lymphocytes in the secondary lymphoid organs.

Recent studies has suggested that the functional non-canonical NF-κB pathway is modulated by canonical NF-κB signalling. For example, syntheses of the constituents of the non-canonical pathway, viz RelB and p52, are controlled by canonical IKK2-IκB-RelA:p50 signalling. Moreover, generation of canonical and non-canonical dimers, viz RelA:p50 and RelB:p52, within the cellular milieu are mechanistically interlinked. These analyses suggest that an integrated NF-κB system network underlies activation of both RelA and RelB containing dimer and that a malfunctioning canonical pathway will lead to an aberrant cellular response also through the non-canonical pathway.

Most intriguingly, a recent study identified that TNF-induced canonical signalling subverts non-canonical RelB:p52 activity in the inflamed lymphoid tissues limiting lymphocyte ingress. Mechanistically, TNF inactivated NIK in LTβR‐stimulated cells and induced the synthesis of Nfkb2 mRNA encoding p100; these together potently accumulated unprocessed p100, which attenuated the RelB activity. A role of p100/Nfkb2 in dictating lymphocyte ingress in the inflamed lymphoid tissue may have broad physiological implications.

== See also ==
- NF-κB
