= ASB1 =

Protein-coding gene in humans

Identifiers
- Aliases: ASB1, ASB-1, ankyrin repeat and SOCS box containing 1
- External IDs: OMIM: 605758; MGI: 1929735; GeneCards: ASB1

Gene location (Human)
Chr.	Chromosome 2 (human)
Band	2q37.3	Start	238,426,742 bp
Band	2q37.3	End	238,452,250 bp

Gene location (Mouse)
Chr.	Chromosome 1 (mouse)
Band	1 D|1 46.19 cM	Start	91,468,266 bp
Band	1 D|1 46.19 cM	End	91,487,311 bp
RNA expression pattern
Bgee	Human / Mouse (ortholog); Top expressed in: apex of heart; C1 segment; nucleus accumbens; right auricle of heart; putamen; amygdala; left ventricle; hypothalamus; substantia nigra; caudate nucleus / Top expressed in: blood; otolith organ; utricle; seminiferous tubule; lumbar spinal ganglion; supraoptic nucleus; yolk sac; spermatocyte; substantia nigra; lumbar subsegment of spinal cord; More reference expression data
BioGPS	n/a
Gene ontology
Molecular function	protein binding; ubiquitin protein ligase activity
Cellular component	cytosol; ubiquitin ligase complex
Biological process	multicellular organism development; intracellular signal transduction; male genitalia development; post-translational protein modification; protein ubiquitination
Sources:Amigo / QuickGO
Orthologs
Databases	NCBI: entry; OMA: entry
Species	Human	Mouse
Entrez	51665	65247
Ensembl	ENSG00000065802	ENSMUSG00000026311
UniProt	Q9Y576	Q9WV74
RefSeq (mRNA)	NM_001040445; NM_016114; NM_001330196	NM_001039126; NM_023046
RefSeq (protein)	NP_001035535; NP_001317125	NP_001034215; NP_075533
Location (UCSC)	Chr 2: 238.43 – 238.45 Mb	Chr 1: 91.47 – 91.49 Mb
PubMed search
- Wikidata
View/Edit Human	View/Edit Mouse

Ankyrin repeat and SOCS box protein 1 is a protein that is in humans, encoded by the ASB1 gene.

The protein encoded by this gene is a member of the ankyrin repeat and SOCS box-containing (ASB) family of proteins. They contain ankyrin repeat sequence and SOCS box domain. The SOCS box serves to couple suppressor of cytokine signalling (SOCS) proteins and their binding partners with the elongin B and C complex, possibly targeting them for degradation.
