= ASB2 =

Protein-coding gene in the species Homo sapiens

Identifiers
- Aliases: ASB2, ASB-2, ankyrin repeat and SOCS box containing 2
- External IDs: OMIM: 605759; MGI: 1929743; GeneCards: ASB2

Gene location (Human)
Chr.	Chromosome 14 (human)
Band	14q32.12	Start	93,934,166 bp
Band	14q32.12	End	93,976,739 bp

Gene location (Mouse)
Chr.	Chromosome 12 (mouse)
Band	12 E|12 52.9 cM	Start	103,287,401 bp
Band	12 E|12 52.9 cM	End	103,322,260 bp
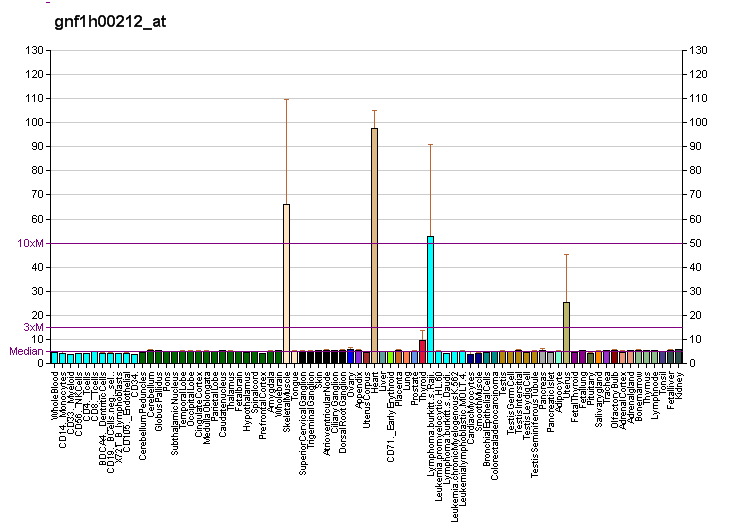
RNA expression pattern
Bgee	Human / Mouse (ortholog); Top expressed in: skeletal muscle tissue; gastrocnemius muscle; muscle of thigh; apex of heart; left ventricle; smooth muscle tissue; muscle layer of sigmoid colon; right auricle of heart; left uterine tube; right coronary artery / Top expressed in: knee joint; muscle of thigh; vastus lateralis muscle; triceps brachii muscle; temporal muscle; myocardium of ventricle; tibialis anterior muscle; sternocleidomastoid muscle; digastric muscle; skeletal muscle tissue; More reference expression data
BioGPS	More reference expression data
Gene ontology
Molecular function	protein binding; ubiquitin protein ligase activity
Cellular component	Cul5-RING ubiquitin ligase complex; cytosol; ubiquitin ligase complex
Biological process	skeletal muscle cell differentiation; myoblast differentiation; intracellular signal transduction; protein polyubiquitination; signal transduction; post-translational protein modification; protein ubiquitination; ubiquitin-dependent protein catabolic process
Sources:Amigo / QuickGO
Orthologs
Databases	NCBI: entry; OMA: entry
Species	Human	Mouse
Entrez	51676	65256
Ensembl	ENSG00000100628; ENSG00000278693	ENSMUSG00000021200
UniProt	Q96Q27	Q8K0L0
RefSeq (mRNA)	NM_001202429; NM_016150	NM_023049; NM_001374764
RefSeq (protein)	NP_001189358; NP_057234	NP_075536; NP_001361693
Location (UCSC)	Chr 14: 93.93 – 93.98 Mb	Chr 12: 103.29 – 103.32 Mb
PubMed search
- Wikidata
View/Edit Human	View/Edit Mouse

Ankyrin repeat and SOCS box protein 2 (ASBS) is a protein that is encoded by the ASB2 gene in humans.

The ASB2 protein belongs to the ankyrin repeat and SOCS box-containing (ASB) family of proteins. It consists of an ankyrin repeat sequence and a SOCS box domain. The SOCS box plays a role in connecting suppressor of cytokine signaling (SOCS) proteins and their binding partners with the elongin B and C complex, potentially facilitating their degradation. This gene is induced by all-trans retinoic acid. In myeloid leukemia cells, the expression of this encoded protein has been shown to induce growth inhibition and chromatin condensation. Multiple alternatively spliced transcript variants have been described for this gene but their full length sequences are not known.
