= ASB13 =

Protein-coding gene in the species Homo sapiens

Identifiers
- Aliases: ASB13, ankyrin repeat and SOCS box containing 13
- External IDs: OMIM: 615055; MGI: 2145525; GeneCards: ASB13

Gene location (Mouse)
Chr.	Chromosome 13 (mouse)
Band	13|13 A1	Start	3,684,032 bp
Band	13|13 A1	End	3,703,822 bp
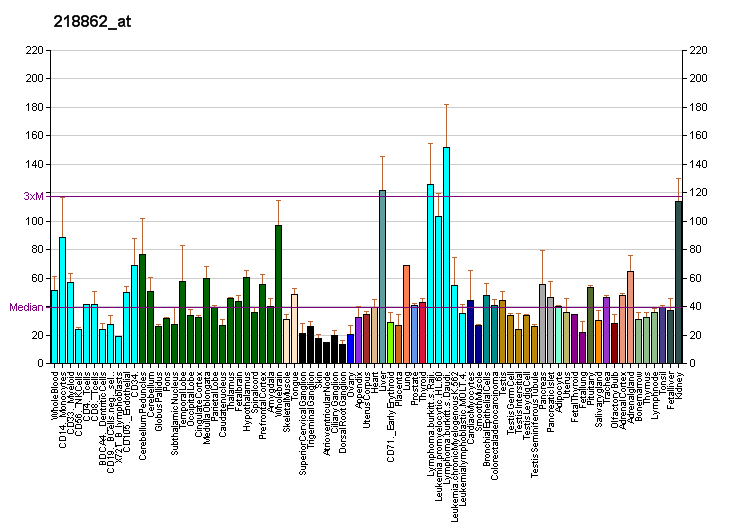
RNA expression pattern
Bgee	Human / Mouse (ortholog); Top expressed in: retinal pigment epithelium; right lobe of liver; kidney tubule; gastric mucosa; kidney; tibia; duodenum; metanephric glomerulus; Brodmann area 9; prefrontal cortex / Top expressed in: deep cerebellar nuclei; medial vestibular nucleus; pontine nuclei; dorsal tegmental nucleus; medial geniculate nucleus; lateral geniculate nucleus; inferior colliculi; globus pallidus; medial dorsal nucleus; superior colliculus; More reference expression data
BioGPS	More reference expression data
Gene ontology
Molecular function	protein binding
Cellular component	cytosol
Biological process	protein ubiquitination; intracellular signal transduction; post-translational protein modification
Sources:Amigo / QuickGO
Orthologs
Databases	NCBI: entry
Species	Human	Mouse
Entrez	79754	142688
Ensembl	n/a	ENSMUSG00000033781
UniProt	Q8WXK3	Q8VBX0
RefSeq (mRNA)	NM_024701	NM_001267724; NM_178283
RefSeq (protein)	NP_078977	NP_001254653; NP_840068
Location (UCSC)	n/a	Chr 13: 3.68 – 3.7 Mb
PubMed search
- Wikidata
View/Edit Human	View/Edit Mouse

Ankyrin repeat and SOCS box protein 13 is a protein that in humans is encoded by the ASB13 gene.

The protein encoded by this gene is a member of the ankyrin repeat and SOCS box-containing (ASB) family of proteins. They contain ankyrin repeat sequence and a SOCS box domain. The SOCS box serves to couple suppressor of cytokine signalling (SOCS) proteins and their binding partners with the elongin B and C complex, possibly targeting them for degradation. Multiple alternatively spliced transcript variants have been described for this gene, but their full-length sequences are not known.
