= HACE1 =

Protein-coding gene found in humans

Identifiers
- Aliases: HACE1, SPPRS, HECT domain and ankyrin repeat containing E3 ubiquitin protein ligase 1
- External IDs: OMIM: 610876; MGI: 2446110; GeneCards: HACE1
Enzyme activity
| EC # | BRENDA | ExPASy | KEGG | MetaCyc |
|---|---|---|---|---|
| 2.3.2.26 | ↗ | ↗ | ↗ | ↗ |

Gene location (Mouse)
| Chr. | Chromosome 10 (mouse) |
| Band | 10|10 B2 | Start | 45,453,925 bp |
| Band | 10|10 B2 | End | 45,588,441 bp |
Gene ontology
| Molecular function | protein binding; ubiquitin-protein transferase activity; transferase activity; ubiquitin protein ligase activity |
| Cellular component | cytoplasm; Golgi cisterna membrane; Golgi membrane; Golgi apparatus; membrane; endoplasmic reticulum; nucleus; nuclear body |
| Biological process | protein K48-linked ubiquitination; cell cycle; Rac protein signal transduction; regulation of cell migration; regulation of transcription, DNA-templated; membrane fusion; Golgi organization; protein ubiquitination; transcription, DNA-templated; ubiquitin-dependent protein catabolic process; protein polyubiquitination |
Sources:Amigo / QuickGO
Orthologs
| Databases | NCBI: entry; OMA: entry |
| Species | Human | Mouse |
| Entrez | 57531 | 209462 |
| Ensembl | ENSG00000085382 | ENSMUSG00000038822 |
| UniProt | Q8IYU2 | Q3U0D9 |
| RefSeq (mRNA) | NM_020771; NM_001321080; NM_001321083; NM_001321084 | NM_172473 |
| RefSeq (protein) | NP_001308009; NP_001308012; NP_001308013; NP_065822; NP_001337483 NP_001337484; NP_001337485; NP_001337486; NP_001337487; NP_001337488; NP_001337489 | NP_766061 |
| Location (UCSC) | n/a | Chr 10: 45.45 – 45.59 Mb |
| PubMed search |
- Wikidata
| View/Edit Human | View/Edit Mouse |

HECT domain and ankyrin repeat containing E3 ubiquitin protein ligase 1 is a protein that in humans is encoded by the HACE1 gene.

== Function ==
This gene encodes a HECT domain and ankyrin repeat-containing ubiquitin ligase. The encoded protein is involved in specific tagging of target proteins, leading to their subcellular localization or proteasomal degradation. The protein is a potential tumor suppressor and is involved in the pathophysiology of several tumors, including Wilm's tumor. [provided by RefSeq, Mar 2016].
