= NUDT12 =

Protein-coding gene in the species Homo sapiens

Identifiers
- Aliases: NUDT12, nudix hydrolase 12
- External IDs: OMIM: 609232; MGI: 1915243; GeneCards: NUDT12
Enzyme activity
EC #	BRENDA	ExPASy	KEGG	MetaCyc
3.6.1.22	↗	↗	↗	↗

Gene location (Human)
Chr.	Chromosome 5 (human)
Band	5q21.2	Start	103,548,855 bp
Band	5q21.2	End	103,562,790 bp

Gene location (Mouse)
Chr.	Chromosome 17 (mouse)
Band	17|17 D	Start	59,306,613 bp
Band	17|17 D	End	59,320,367 bp
RNA expression pattern
Bgee	Human / Mouse (ortholog); Top expressed in: islet of Langerhans; jejunal mucosa; rectum; Achilles tendon; testicle; body of pancreas; right adrenal cortex; vastus lateralis muscle; mucosa of paranasal sinus; left adrenal gland / Top expressed in: left lobe of liver; brown adipose tissue; intercostal muscle; human kidney; Epithelium of choroid plexus; right kidney; lobe of prostate; adrenal gland; white adipose tissue; proximal tubule; More reference expression data
BioGPS	n/a
Gene ontology
Molecular function	NAD+ diphosphatase activity; protein binding; hydrolase activity; metal ion binding; NADH pyrophosphatase activity
Cellular component	cytoplasm; peroxisome; nucleus; peroxisomal matrix; cytosol
Biological process	NAD catabolic process; NADP catabolic process; NAD biosynthesis via nicotinamide riboside salvage pathway; NADH metabolic process
Sources:Amigo / QuickGO
Orthologs
Databases	NCBI: entry; OMA: entry
Species	Human	Mouse
Entrez	83594	67993
Ensembl	ENSG00000112874	ENSMUSG00000024228
UniProt	Q9BQG2	Q9DCN1
RefSeq (mRNA)	NM_001300741; NM_031438	NM_026497; NM_001368393
RefSeq (protein)	NP_001287670; NP_113626	NP_080773; NP_001355322
Location (UCSC)	Chr 5: 103.55 – 103.56 Mb	Chr 17: 59.31 – 59.32 Mb
PubMed search
- Wikidata
View/Edit Human	View/Edit Mouse

Peroxisomal NADH pyrophosphatase NUDT12 is an enzyme that in humans is encoded by the NUDT12 gene.

Nucleotides are involved in numerous biochemical reactions and pathways within the cell as substrates, cofactors, and effectors.

Nudix hydrolases, such as NUDT12, regulate the concentrations of individual nucleotides and of nucleotide ratios in response to changing circumstances (Abdelraheim et al., 2003).[supplied by OMIM]
