= Notch regulated ankyrin repeat protein =

Mammalian protein found in Homo sapiens

NRARP

Identifiers
- Aliases: NRARP, NOTCH-regulated ankyrin repeat protein, NOTCH regulated ankyrin repeat protein
- External IDs: MGI: 1914372; GeneCards: NRARP

Gene location (Human)
Chr.	Chromosome 9 (human)
Band	9q34.3	Start	137,299,631 bp
Band	9q34.3	End	137,302,271 bp

Gene location (Mouse)
Chr.	Chromosome 2 (mouse)
Band	2|2 A3	Start	25,070,770 bp
Band	2|2 A3	End	25,073,351 bp
RNA expression pattern
Bgee	Human / Mouse (ortholog); Top expressed in: mucosa of sigmoid colon; mucosa of ileum; mucosa of transverse colon; skin of arm; pancreatic epithelial cell; mucosa of pharynx; pancreatic ductal cell; trachea; gingival epithelium; nipple / Top expressed in: paraxial mesoderm; transitional epithelium of urinary bladder; hair follicle; medial ganglionic eminence; skin of abdomen; skin of back; lip; ventricular zone; Paneth cell; conjunctival fornix; More reference expression data
BioGPS	n/a
Orthologs
Databases	NCBI: entry; OMA: entry
Species	Human	Mouse
Entrez	441478	67122
Ensembl	ENSG00000198435	ENSMUSG00000078202
UniProt	Q7Z6K4	Q91ZA8
RefSeq (mRNA)	NM_001004354	NM_025980
RefSeq (protein)	NP_001004354	NP_080256
Location (UCSC)	Chr 9: 137.3 – 137.3 Mb	Chr 2: 25.07 – 25.07 Mb
PubMed search
- Wikidata
View/Edit Human	View/Edit Mouse

NOTCH regulated ankyrin repeat protein is a protein that in humans is encoded by the NRARP gene. It is also found in insects, nematodes, mammals, and sea urchins. The Notch Regulated Ankyrin Repeat Protein is expressed in many tissues, including the brain, heart, colon, kidney, and lungs. It can also be found in developing body structures, such as the presomitic mesoderm, vascular endothelial cells, and neural plate. This suggests that NRARP plays an important role in tissues, including those that are still developing. In humans, the NRARP gene is located on chromosome 9, the band it is on is 9q34.3. For the strand, it is on the reverse (negative) strand. For mice, it is on chromosome 2.

Participates in the Notch signaling pathway. Acts upstream or downstream of the negative regulation of the Notch signaling pathway and the positive regulation of the standard Wnt signaling pathway.

The Notch Regulated Ankyrin Repeat Protein (NRARP) is part of a negative feedback system that helps control the Notch signaling pathway. It also plays a role in regulating the Wnt signaling pathway.. NRARP is rapidly induced by the Notch activation and plays a role in controlling the strength, duration, and downstream transcriptional output of Notch signaling. The notch and Wnt pathways both mediate important signaling processes in cells. NRARP is the positive regulator of the transcription factor LEF1, which can block some of its degradation. Additionally, there are different genes in the family that encode various amounts of the membrane receptors. The Notch intracellular domain travels to the cell nucleus, where it interacts with the recombination signal-binding protein for the immunoglobulin kappa J region (RBPJ) and other transcriptional cofactors to initiate expression of the Notch target genes. There is one that codes for a 114-amino-acid protein containing two ankyrin repeat motifs.

== Structure ==
NRARP is composed of multiple ankyrin repeat domains, each consisting of 33 amino acid residues and containing two alpha helices connected by a loop.Most forms of the NRARP include two to three ankyrin repeat motifs. This can be shown as an arrangement that creates a curved structure from a linear solenoid. This arrangement creates a protein-protein interaction. Then, this correlates well with Notch activation of NRARP to bind partner proteins.

The ankyrin repeat domain can contain multiple repeats, which eventually form a linear structure. The solenoid structure involved is composed of layered ankyrin repeats, which form a long rod. This is a stable structure. This shape provides a surface for the NRARP to interact with other proteins. This promoter is connected with the RBPJ, the Recombination Signaling Binding Protein for the immunoglobulin kappa J region. The NRARP then participates in transcriptional activation by the NICD-RBPJ-MAML complex, which binds directly to DNA and regulates the expression of the genes that are activated from the notch signaling. When it can act quickly on the pathway, it is considered an early response gene.

The structure can be observed in X-ray crystallography, which reveals the NICD-RBPJ complex in its functional state. It is shown at a 3.75-A resolution, indicating that the interface depends on the three ankyrin repeats of NRARP. This arrangement explains how the NRARP influences the amount of stability of the Notch transcriptional complex.

== Function ==
At the start of its activity, the NRARP is involved in many processes, such as negative feedback in the notch pathway, somite patterning in the early stages of development, the breakdown of NICD, and T-Cell development. Each of these roles contributes to maintaining balanced notch signaling and preventing activation.

The NRARP mainly acts as a negative feedback regulator, meaning it helps keep the strength and the duration of notch signaling in check. When it is expressed, the NRARP has a pathway that has a loop, which is a negative feedback loop that pushes the pathway back toward equilibrium. It interacts with the NICD, the active fragment of the notch receptor. This interaction promotes the target protein that can then be used for different functions as proteasomal degradation. All of this prolongs the notch activity and maintains control of the cellular homeostasis, and does not disrupt any transformations.

NRARP plays many different roles across many other signaling pathways and can function as various processes. NRARP can depend on the types of tissues and biological processes involved. It's best known as the feedback regulator of the Notch signaling pathway. For example, it plays a role in cancer biology, as a feedback regulator in the notch pathway and the Wnt signaling pathway, with a dual role in acute lymphoblastic leukemia (T-ALL) and in vascular development, by coordinating the correct timing and intensity of the multiple pathways of the locations of these types of developments to happen. NRARP helps ensure proper development processes, preventing errors in the body or blood vessels, which must be balanced and timed well.

=== Somite patterning ===
Somite patterning is another process that influences NRARP through its interaction pattern of the correct way of the embryonic somites, which is from head to tail. The somites are the repetition of the block-like structures. It happens because the vertebrae, skeletal muscles, and other attachments of insects need to develop, which are connected to the axis for this. This rhythmic formation follows a timed process called the segmentation clock. This pattern determines where certain genes are expressed on the protein over time. This includes the segmentation clock as well, which regulates the formation of genes, like building blocks for the vertebrae. Notch signaling helps maintain the correct size of somites. The correct somite pattern is crucial for the development of later structures, including limbs, vertebrae, and certain muscle groups..When Notch and NRARP function correctly, the embryo maintains proper organization. It's a spiral pattern in a time of formation. These animals develop well-organized skeletal muscles.

=== NICD degradation ===
NRARP also plays a key role in the regulated turnover of the notch intracellular domain (NICD). It begins when NRARP binds to the notch transcriptional complex (NTC). It requires the RBPJ and other cofactors for NRARP to bind the NTC and function. Once it is bound, NRARP promotes NICD turnover via the proteasomal pathway. NICD is crucial because it prevents the pathway from staying switched on. Ensuring that NICD is removed at the correct time demonstrates precise regulation, which is essential for the formation of adult tissue and for controlling cell number. The NICD is the active signaling portion of the notch receptor. This is crucial for preventing the pathway's activation.

=== Epithelial-mesenchymal transition (EMT) ===
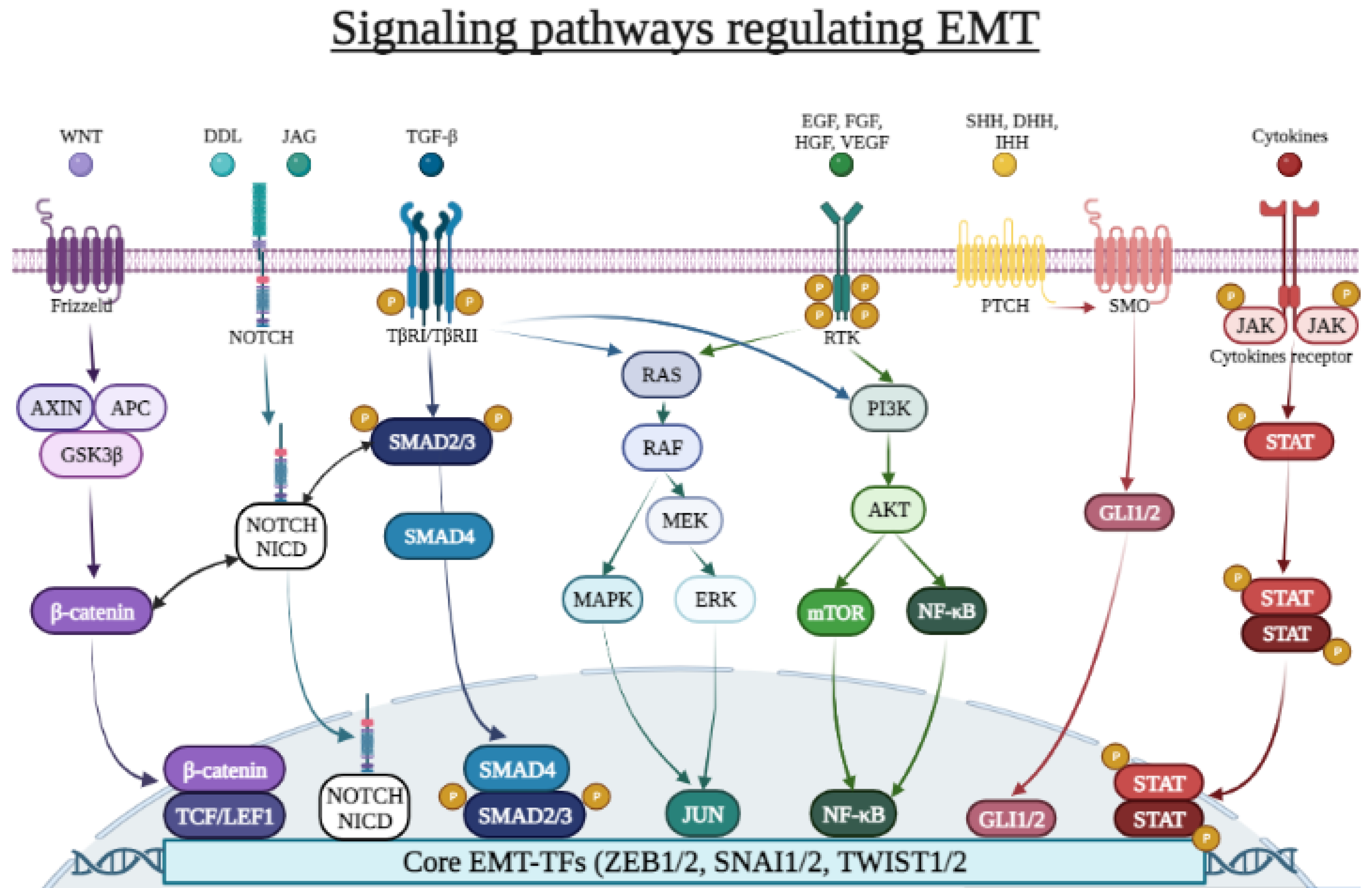
When EMT is involved in the Notch-regulated ankyrin repeat protein, it is produced by NRARP. When NRARP is a suppressor, it limits EMT by preventing notch signaling from continuing. It is a pathway of the EMT that is connected to the functional portion of NRARP.

Another important function of NRARP in cancers is its ability to restrain epithelial-mesenchymal transition. It is a biological process in which epithelial cells can usually remain in place but can also transform into moving mesenchymal cells. These cells can acquire properties associated with increased movement and invasiveness. This transition is a major component of metastasis and fibrosis. It allows cancer cells to move to new areas and make new tumors. EMT is also connected to many tumors, including breast cancer, thyroid cancer, and non-small lung cancer, along with fibrosis. By limiting EMT progression, NRARP can help reduce the invasive potential of the cells that can form tumors and also prevent the properties associated with metastasis. This causes major cellular changes, including alterations in cell-cell adhesion and gene expression.

=== Notch signaling ===
NRARP also functions as a key feedback regulator; it uses the notch signaling pathway. This receptor activation involves extending the ankyrin repeat domain of the NICD. This helps put together a beneficial path that can be used. When the NICD is released into the cell, it initiates transcription of notch target genes, including NRARP. Once NRARP levels increase, it degrades the NICD and shuts down the signal. This forms a loop that supports the development of the segmented clock and prevents the pathway from being active more than it should. The segmented clock is essential during embryogenesis, when growth regulation begins as the embryo's patterns start to form. Proper tissue development is crucial for an animal, as it doesn't want any abnormalities in its tissues.

=== Wnt pathway ===
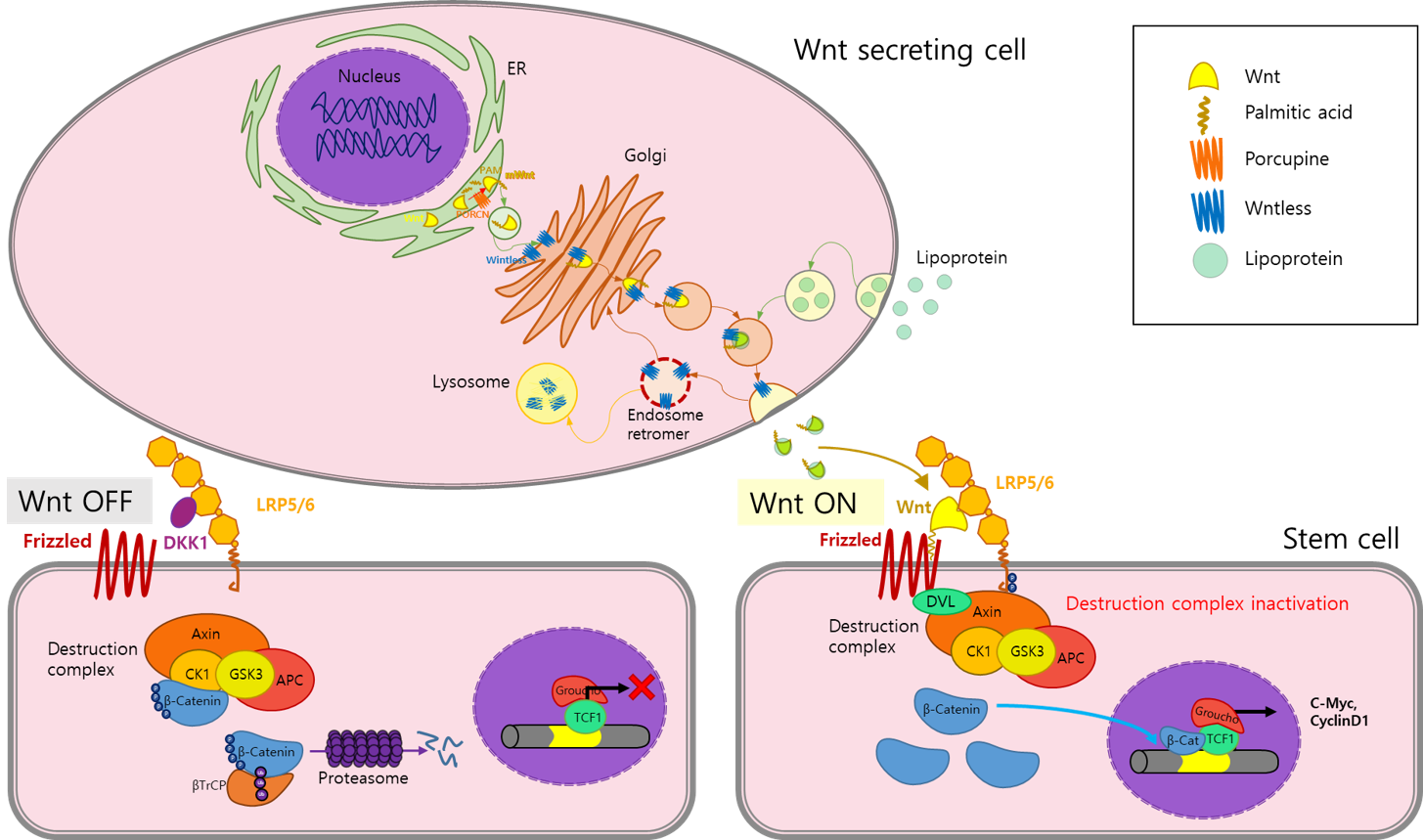
The Wnt pathway is shown, which has NRARP be on the Wnt pathway. It is strengthening beta-catenin, moving, and being active.

In addition to its connection with the Wnt pathway, NRARP has a significant role. NRARP is a target for the path. When the notch is turned on, it helps link Notch and Wnt activity in many cell types. This initiates NRARP gene expression. It binds to notch, then shows the NICD breakdown. Through this connection, the notch response serves as an activator for many cells in the Wnt pathway output, providing stability and activity of the LEFT1 transcription factor. NRARP can be connected to notch-dependent (T-ALL) cells via two members of the NICD and the transcription factor RBPJ. The Wnt pathway is connected to the NRARP, serving as a bridge between T-cells and endothelial cells. This shows the cell fate and developmental factors like lymphoid enhancer-binding factor 1 (LEF1)

Wnt signaling also connects to notch signaling, which can promote tumor growth or regression and affects T-cell acute lymphoblastic leukemia (T-ALL). How notch signaling and Wnt signaling affect the amount of cancer. This happens when the notch receptor complex promotes deformation and stabilizes Wnt's LEFT1. The way notch interacts with Wnt is by having the notch gene be responsive, with its production regulated by signaling. This transfers back to the notch, which is a positive sign for Wnt as well. Once there is a pathway from Wnt, there is then NRARP, which blocks ubiquitination of LEFT1, stabilizing LEFT1 and increasing the activity of the Wnt signaling pathway. This is critical for growth. NRARP is connected to the stability of LEFT1, which, in turn, induces the Wnt signaling pathway. When NRARP is in motion, it acts independently in the Wnt pathway, promoting LEFT1 stability during Wnt activation. It then has NRARP connecting to the transcriptional activation complex to form a larger structure, and the breakdown of NICD, which then acts as a negative regulator of Notch's signaling. NRARP is important because it connects Wnt and Notch signals, which help control the intensity of these pathways.

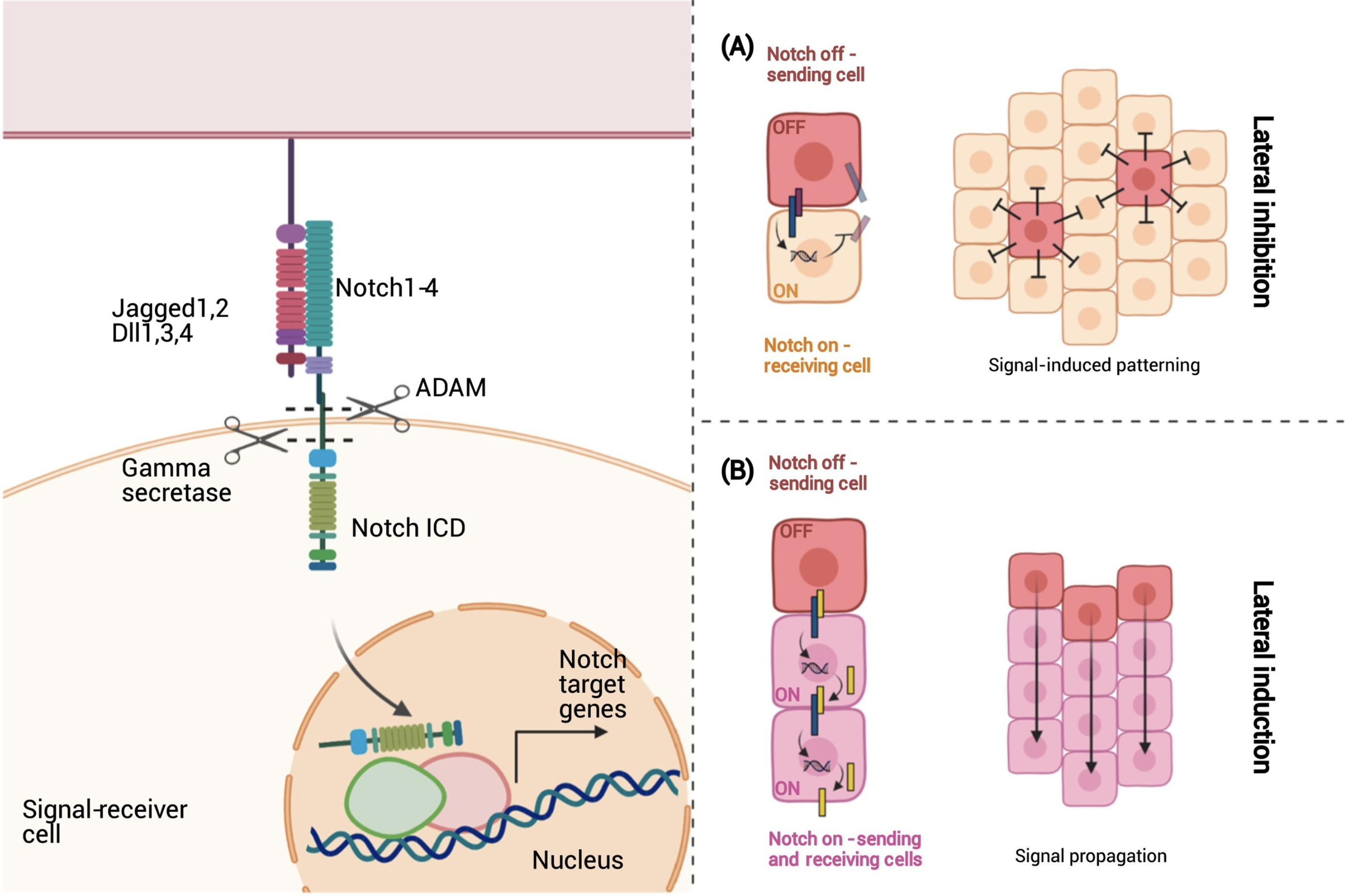
NICD is being released, enters the nucleus, and starts the target genes, which are the notch-targeted ones.

== Mechanism ==
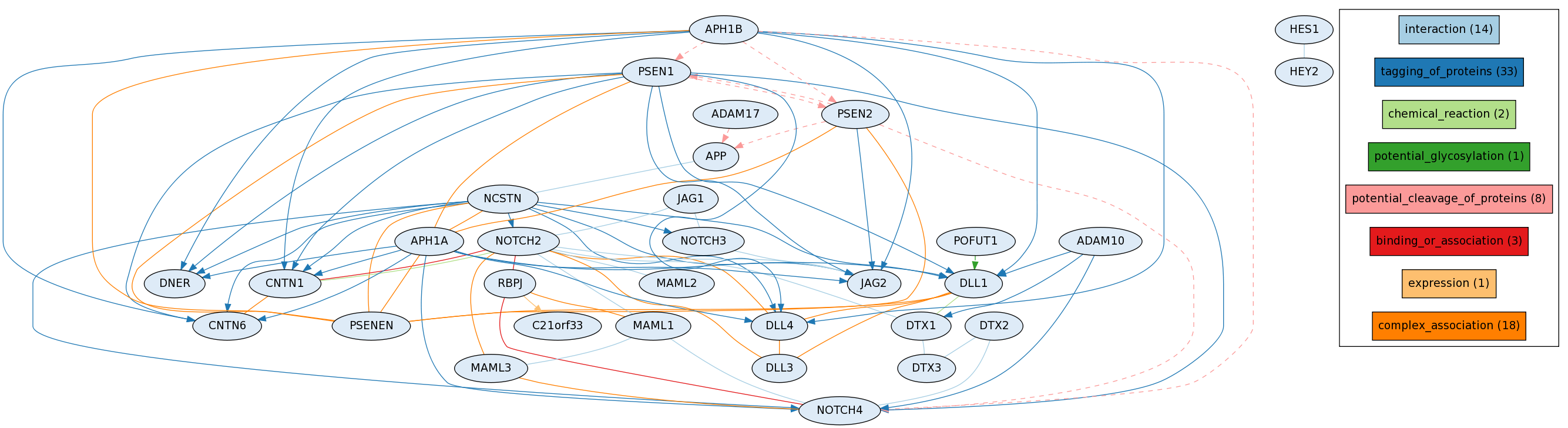
A pathway of the notch signaling pathway, on which the NRARP uses its function. The RBPJ is a nuclear transcriptional cofactor that is a component of the function.

Before the activation process starts, the NRARP is a small cytoplasmic and nuclear protein rather than a membrane-bound type of component. When it binds the notch receptor, it is cleaved, releasing the notch intracellular domain (NICD) into the cytoplasm. This describes one element of the notch signaling pathway. NICD interacts with the notch transcriptional activation complex, which enters the nucleus to initiate transcription of specific genes. In the nucleus, it binds directly to the NRARP, which is located at the center of the transcriptional activation complex. From there, it works with RBP J to turn on target genes, thereby functioning as a key regulator of the notch signaling pathway. As a functioning part of the negative feedback mechanism.

The human NRARP gene sequence code is 2,641 base pairs long, starting with agtgctgcgg and ending with gtttcttggtc.NRARP usually acts as a bridge from the nucleus to the cell surface. It helps communicate the amount of cell growth and development. It is present in both growing and adult tissue, which is why it is crucial for notch signaling and maintaining cellular function throughout the human body.

== Clinical significance ==
=== Cancer ===
As for cancer, NRARP's primary job is as a negative regulator of the oncogenic notch pathway. It is also involved in blocking tumor growth in the body. It has two roles in the human body related to cancer. By limiting notch signaling, NRARP can, in fact, reduce cancer cell growth and cell division. It can determine whether it increases or decreases, depending on the type of cancer and the pathway's cellular context. For NRARP, its major function is connecting with the NICD, as well as the (RBPJ) transcription factor. RBPJ acts as a component of the pathway repressor when the signal is activated, with NICD bound. When NRARP is connected with this complex, it can help suppress the downstream Notch target gene expression. All of this can reduce the growth of cancer cells with tumors involved.
