= NFKBIL1 =

Protein-coding gene in the species Homo sapiens

Identifiers
- Aliases: NFKBIL1, IKBL, LST1, NFKBIL, NFKB inhibitor like 1
- External IDs: OMIM: 601022; MGI: 1340031; GeneCards: NFKBIL1

Gene location (Human)
Chr.	Chromosome 6 (human)
Band	6p21.33	Start	31,546,870 bp
Band	6p21.33	End	31,558,829 bp

Gene location (Mouse)
Chr.	Chromosome 17 (mouse)
Band	17 B1|17 18.6 cM	Start	35,439,151 bp
Band	17 B1|17 18.6 cM	End	35,454,768 bp
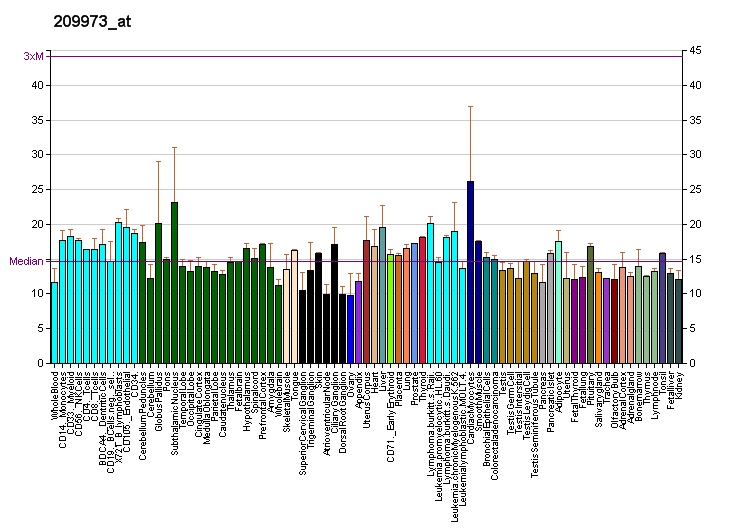
RNA expression pattern
Bgee	Human / Mouse (ortholog); Top expressed in: testicle; body of pancreas; body of stomach; fundus; apex of heart; left ovary; gastric mucosa; right ovary; muscle layer of sigmoid colon; gastrocnemius muscle / Top expressed in: granulocyte; muscle of thigh; internal carotid artery; spermatid; external carotid artery; ventricular zone; seminiferous tubule; fossa; spermatocyte; epiblast; More reference expression data
BioGPS	More reference expression data
Gene ontology
Molecular function	protein binding
Cellular component	cytosol; nucleus
Biological process	cytoplasmic sequestering of transcription factor; negative regulation of tumor necrosis factor production; negative regulation of toll-like receptor signaling pathway; I-kappaB kinase/NF-kappaB signaling; negative regulation of NF-kappaB transcription factor activity; cellular response to lipopolysaccharide; negative regulation of lipopolysaccharide-mediated signaling pathway
Sources:Amigo / QuickGO
Orthologs
Databases	NCBI: entry; OMA: entry
Species	Human	Mouse
Entrez	4795	18038
Ensembl	ENSG00000206440; ENSG00000234530; ENSG00000236346; ENSG00000235125; ENSG00000236196 ENSG00000204498; ENSG00000227565	ENSMUSG00000042419
UniProt	Q9UBC1	O88995
RefSeq (mRNA)	NM_005007; NM_001144961; NM_001144962; NM_001144963	NM_010909; NM_001364909
RefSeq (protein)	NP_001138433; NP_001138434; NP_001138435; NP_004998	NP_035039; NP_001351838
Location (UCSC)	Chr 6: 31.55 – 31.56 Mb	Chr 17: 35.44 – 35.45 Mb
PubMed search
- Wikidata
View/Edit Human	View/Edit Mouse

NF-kappa-B inhibitor-like protein 1 is a protein that in humans is encoded by the NFKBIL1 gene.

== Function ==
This gene encodes a divergent member of the I-kappa-B family of proteins. Its function is unclear. The gene lies within the major histocompatibility complex (MHC) class I region on chromosome 6.
