= GPANK1 =

Protein-coding gene in humans

Identifiers
- Aliases: GPANK1, ANKRD59, BAT4, D6S54E, G5, GPATCH10, G-patch domain and ankyrin repeats 1
- External IDs: OMIM: 142610; MGI: 2148975; GeneCards: GPANK1

Gene location (Human)
Chr.	Chromosome 6 (human)
Band	6p21.33	Start	31,661,228 bp
Band	6p21.33	End	31,666,283 bp

Gene location (Mouse)
Chr.	Chromosome 17 (mouse)
Band	17 B1|17 18.59 cM	Start	35,340,431 bp
Band	17 B1|17 18.59 cM	End	35,343,790 bp
RNA expression pattern
Bgee	Human / Mouse (ortholog); Top expressed in: left testis; right testis; apex of heart; blood; sural nerve; gastrocnemius muscle; gonad; Achilles tendon; left ventricle; muscle of thigh / Top expressed in: epithelium of small intestine; intestinal villus; Ileal epithelium; spermatid; granulocyte; bone marrow; inferior colliculi; spermatocyte; superior colliculus; testicle; More reference expression data
BioGPS	n/a
Orthologs
Databases	NCBI: entry; OMA: entry
Species	Human	Mouse
Entrez	7918	81845
Ensembl	ENSG00000236011; ENSG00000206408; ENSG00000204438; ENSG00000223932; ENSG00000228605 ENSG00000232312; ENSG00000233210	ENSMUSG00000092417
UniProt	O95872	Q61858
RefSeq (mRNA)	NM_001199237; NM_001199238; NM_001199239; NM_001199240; NM_033177	NM_001128597; NM_032460
RefSeq (protein)	NP_001186166; NP_001186167; NP_001186168; NP_001186169; NP_149417	NP_001122069; NP_115849
Location (UCSC)	Chr 6: 31.66 – 31.67 Mb	Chr 17: 35.34 – 35.34 Mb
PubMed search
- Wikidata
View/Edit Human	View/Edit Mouse

G patch domain and ankyrin repeat-containing protein 1 is a protein that in humans is encoded by the GPANK1 gene (previously BAT4).

A cluster of genes, BAT1-BAT5, has been localized in the vicinity of the genes for TNF alpha and TNF beta. These genes are all within the human major histocompatibility complex class III region. The protein encoded by this gene is thought to be involved in some aspects of immunity.
