= ASB6 =

Protein-coding gene in the species Homo sapiens

Identifiers
- Aliases: ASB6, ankyrin repeat and SOCS box containing 6
- External IDs: OMIM: 615051; MGI: 1919573; GeneCards: ASB6

Gene location (Human)
Chr.	Chromosome 9 (human)
Band	9q34.11	Start	129,634,604 bp
Band	9q34.11	End	129,642,169 bp

Gene location (Mouse)
Chr.	Chromosome 2 (mouse)
Band	2|2 B	Start	30,713,109 bp
Band	2|2 B	End	30,720,345 bp
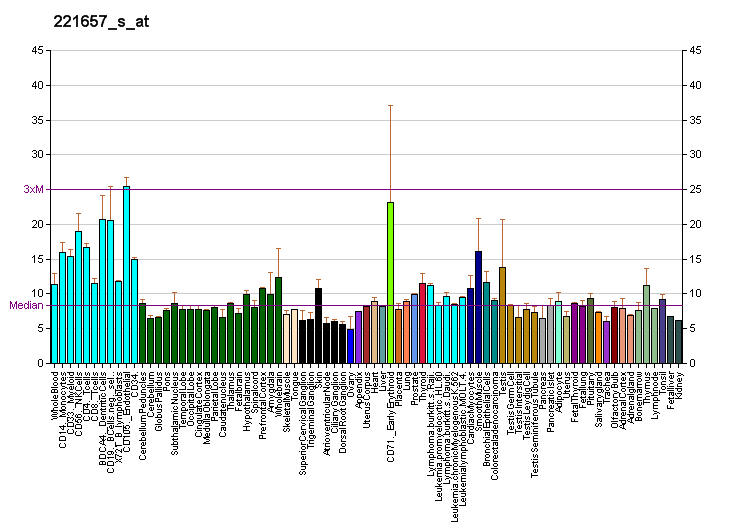
RNA expression pattern
Bgee	Human / Mouse (ortholog); Top expressed in: granulocyte; right frontal lobe; gastric mucosa; right hemisphere of cerebellum; prefrontal cortex; left adrenal cortex; middle temporal gyrus; right adrenal cortex; anterior cingulate cortex; skin of leg / Top expressed in: fetal liver hematopoietic progenitor cell; granulocyte; yolk sac; lip; epiblast; right kidney; submandibular gland; neural layer of retina; embryo; ventricular zone; More reference expression data
BioGPS	More reference expression data
Gene ontology
Molecular function	protein binding
Cellular component	cytoplasm; cytosol
Biological process	intracellular signal transduction; protein ubiquitination; post-translational protein modification
Sources:Amigo / QuickGO
Orthologs
Databases	NCBI: entry; OMA: entry
Species	Human	Mouse
Entrez	140459	72323
Ensembl	ENSG00000148331	ENSMUSG00000039483
UniProt	Q9NWX5	Q91ZU1
RefSeq (mRNA)	NM_177999; NM_001202403; NM_017873	NM_133346
RefSeq (protein)	NP_001189332; NP_060343; NP_821066	NP_579924
Location (UCSC)	Chr 9: 129.63 – 129.64 Mb	Chr 2: 30.71 – 30.72 Mb
PubMed search
- Wikidata
View/Edit Human	View/Edit Mouse

Ankyrin repeat and SOCS box protein 6 is a protein that in humans is encoded by the ASB6 gene.

The protein encoded by this gene belongs to a family of ankyrin repeat proteins that, along with four other protein families, contain a C-terminal SOCS box motif. Growing evidence suggests that the SOCS box, similar to the F-box, acts as a bridge between specific substrate-binding domains and the more generic proteins that comprise a large family of E3 ubiquitin protein ligases.
