= ANKZF1 =

Protein-coding gene in humans

Identifiers
- Aliases: ANKZF1, ain containing 1, ankz8, ZNF744, ankyrin repeat and zinc finger domain containing 1, Vms1, ankyrin repeat and zinc finger peptidyl tRNA hydrolase 1
- External IDs: OMIM: 617541; MGI: 1098746; GeneCards: ANKZF1

Gene location (Human)
Chr.	Chromosome 2 (human)
Band	2q35	Start	219,229,783 bp
Band	2q35	End	219,236,679 bp

Gene location (Mouse)
Chr.	Chromosome 1 (mouse)
Band	1 C4|1 38.62 cM	Start	75,168,795 bp
Band	1 C4|1 38.62 cM	End	75,176,031 bp
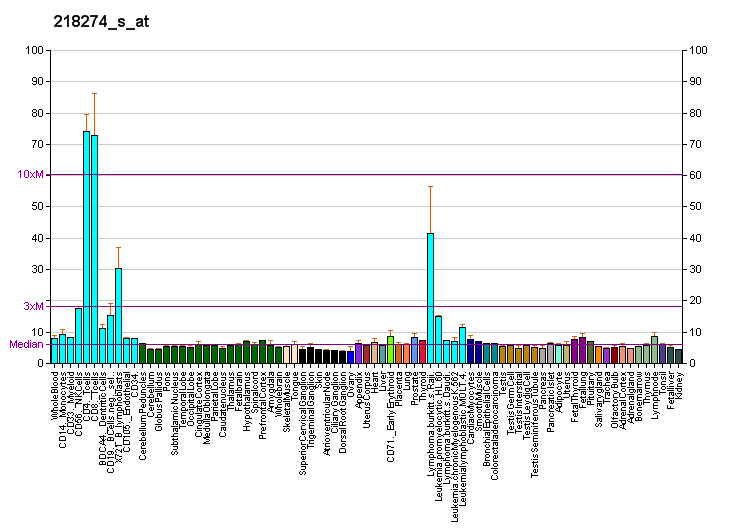
RNA expression pattern
Bgee	Human / Mouse (ortholog); Top expressed in: right uterine tube; right hemisphere of cerebellum; left ovary; right ovary; minor salivary glands; body of pancreas; anterior pituitary; left lobe of thyroid gland; granulocyte; right lobe of thyroid gland / Top expressed in: neural layer of retina; saccule; otic vesicle; granulocyte; otic placode; Ileal epithelium; spermatocyte; right kidney; superior frontal gyrus; ventricular zone; More reference expression data
BioGPS	More reference expression data
Gene ontology
Molecular function	protein binding; thiol-dependent deubiquitinase; metal ion binding; nucleic acid binding
Cellular component	Cdc48p-Npl4p-Vms1p AAA ATPase complex; membrane; cytoplasm
Biological process	nuclear protein quality control by the ubiquitin-proteasome system; mitochondria-associated ubiquitin-dependent protein catabolic process; ubiquitin-dependent ERAD pathway; cellular response to hydrogen peroxide
Sources:Amigo / QuickGO
Orthologs
Databases	NCBI: entry; OMA: entry
Species	Human	Mouse
Entrez	55139	52231
Ensembl	ENSG00000163516	ENSMUSG00000026199
UniProt	Q9H8Y5	Q80UU1
RefSeq (mRNA)	NM_001042410; NM_001282792; NM_018089	NM_001267620; NM_026187
RefSeq (protein)	NP_001035869; NP_001269721; NP_060559	NP_001254549; NP_080463; NP_001391832; NP_001391833; NP_001391834 NP_001391835; NP_001391836
Location (UCSC)	Chr 2: 219.23 – 219.24 Mb	Chr 1: 75.17 – 75.18 Mb
PubMed search
- Wikidata
View/Edit Human	View/Edit Mouse

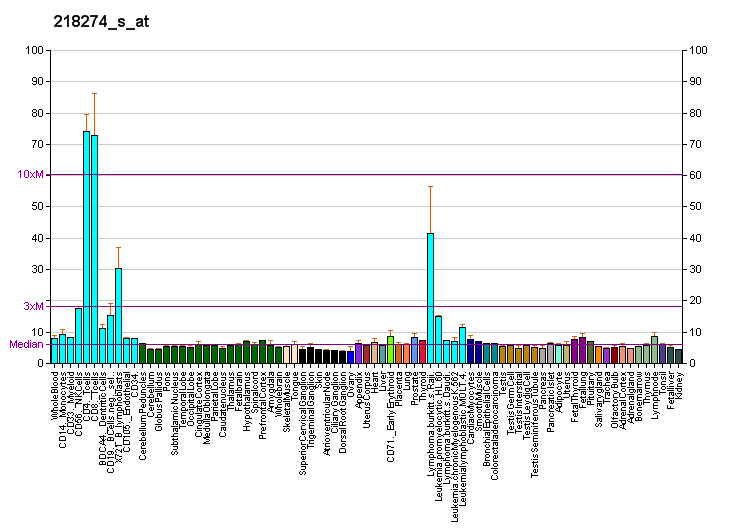
Gene expression pattern of the ANKZF1 gene

Ankyrin repeat and zinc finger domain-containing protein 1 is a protein that in humans is encoded by the ANKZF1 gene.
