= MPHOSPH8 =

Protein-coding gene in the species Homo sapiens

Identifiers
- Aliases: MPHOSPH8, HSMPP8, TWA3, mpp8, M-phase phosphoprotein 8
- External IDs: OMIM: 611626; MGI: 1922589; GeneCards: MPHOSPH8
Available structures
PDB	Ortholog search: PDBe RCSB
PDB	List of PDB id codes 3LWE, 3QO2, 3R93, 3SVM

Gene location (Human)
Chr.	Chromosome 13 (human)
Band	13q12.11	Start	19,633,659 bp
Band	13q12.11	End	19,673,441 bp

Gene location (Mouse)
Chr.	Chromosome 14 (mouse)
Band	14|14 C3	Start	56,905,705 bp
Band	14|14 C3	End	56,934,887 bp
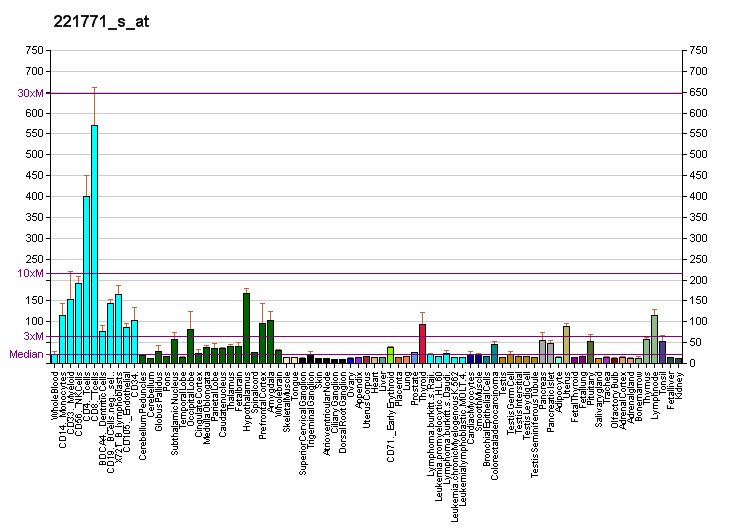
RNA expression pattern
Bgee	Human / Mouse (ortholog); Top expressed in: tendon of biceps brachii; Achilles tendon; sural nerve; left ovary; right ovary; canal of the cervix; cerebellar hemisphere; gastric mucosa; body of uterus; right hemisphere of cerebellum / Top expressed in: zygote; primary oocyte; secondary oocyte; facial motor nucleus; primitive streak; spermatocyte; substantia nigra; condyle; tail of embryo; fossa; More reference expression data
BioGPS	More reference expression data
Gene ontology
Molecular function	methylated histone binding; protein binding; ubiquitin protein ligase binding; ubiquitin-protein transferase activity; chromatin binding
Cellular component	cytoplasm; plasma membrane; nucleolus; nucleus; chromosome; ubiquitin ligase complex; cytosol; heterochromatin
Biological process	regulation of DNA methylation; negative regulation of transcription, DNA-templated; regulation of transcription, DNA-templated; transcription, DNA-templated; protein ubiquitination; negative regulation of gene expression, epigenetic; positive regulation of DNA methylation-dependent heterochromatin assembly; negative regulation of single stranded viral RNA replication via double stranded DNA intermediate
Sources:Amigo / QuickGO
Orthologs
Databases	NCBI: entry; OMA: entry
Species	Human	Mouse
Entrez	54737	75339
Ensembl	ENSG00000196199	ENSMUSG00000079184
UniProt	Q99549	Q3TYA6
RefSeq (mRNA)	NM_017520	NM_023773; NM_001360072
RefSeq (protein)	NP_059990	NP_076262; NP_001347001
Location (UCSC)	Chr 13: 19.63 – 19.67 Mb	Chr 14: 56.91 – 56.93 Mb
PubMed search
- Wikidata
View/Edit Human	View/Edit Mouse

M-phase phosphoprotein 8 is an enzyme that in humans is encoded by the MPHOSPH8 gene.
