= ASAP1 =

Protein-coding gene in humans

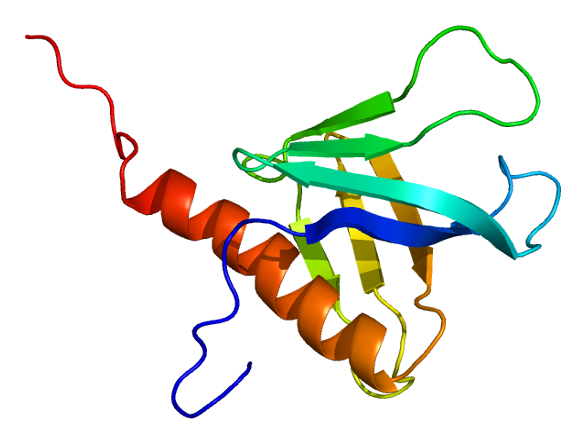

Identifiers
- Aliases: ASAP1, AMAP1, CENTB4, DDEF1, PAG2, PAP, ZG14P, ArfGAP with SH3 domain, ankyrin repeat and PH domain 1
- External IDs: OMIM: 605953; MGI: 1342335; GeneCards: ASAP1
Available structures
PDB	Ortholog search: PDBe RCSB
PDB	List of PDB id codes 2D1X, 2DA0, 2ED1, 2RQT, 2RQU

Gene location (Human)
Chr.	Chromosome 8 (human)
Band	8q24.21-q24.22	Start	130,052,104 bp
Band	8q24.21-q24.22	End	130,443,674 bp

Gene location (Mouse)
Chr.	Chromosome 15 (mouse)
Band	15|15 D1	Start	63,958,706 bp
Band	15|15 D1	End	64,254,768 bp
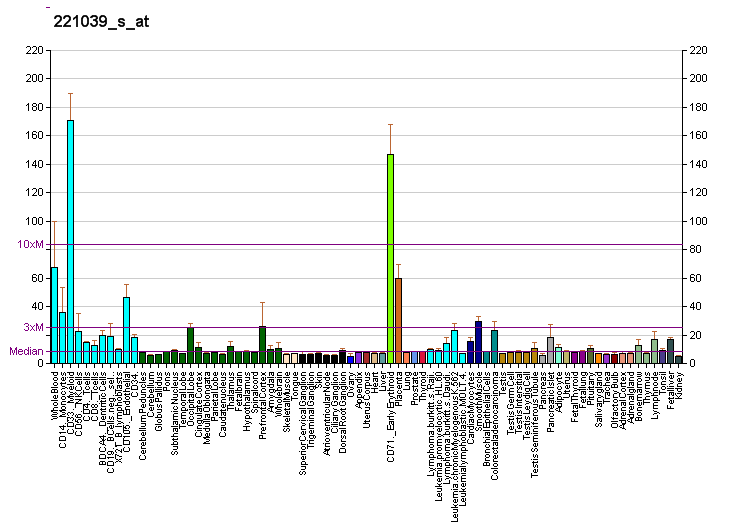
RNA expression pattern
Bgee	Human / Mouse (ortholog); Top expressed in: endothelial cell; sural nerve; trabecular bone; sperm; Achilles tendon; lateral nuclear group of thalamus; oocyte; secondary oocyte; visceral pleura; Brodmann area 23 / Top expressed in: saccule; tail of embryo; genital tubercle; otic placode; otic vesicle; granulocyte; secondary oocyte; Rostral migratory stream; zygote; lumbar spinal ganglion; More reference expression data
BioGPS	More reference expression data
Gene ontology
Molecular function	phosphatidylinositol-4,5-bisphosphate binding; protein binding; phosphatidylinositol-3,4,5-trisphosphate binding; metal ion binding; GTPase activator activity; phosphatidylserine binding; cadherin binding
Cellular component	cytoplasm; cytosol; dendritic spine; membrane; podosome; cell projection membrane; plasma membrane
Biological process	cilium assembly; positive regulation of GTPase activity; negative regulation of dendritic spine development; cell projection organization; positive regulation of podosome assembly; positive regulation of membrane tubulation
Sources:Amigo / QuickGO
Orthologs
Databases	NCBI: entry; OMA: entry
Species	Human	Mouse
Entrez	50807	13196
Ensembl	ENSG00000153317	ENSMUSG00000022377
UniProt	Q9ULH1	Q9QWY8
RefSeq (mRNA)	NM_001247996; NM_018482; NM_001362925; NM_001362926; NM_001362924	NM_001276461; NM_001276462; NM_001276463; NM_001276467; NM_010026
RefSeq (protein)	NP_001234925; NP_060952; NP_001349854; NP_001349855; NP_001349853	NP_001263390; NP_001263391; NP_001263392; NP_001263396; NP_034156
Location (UCSC)	Chr 8: 130.05 – 130.44 Mb	Chr 15: 63.96 – 64.25 Mb
PubMed search
- Wikidata
View/Edit Human	View/Edit Mouse

Arf-GAP with SH3 domain, ANK repeat and PH domain-containing protein 1 is a protein that in humans is encoded by the ASAP1 gene (previously DDEF1) .

== Interactions ==
ASAP1 has been shown to interact with Src.
