= ANKRD26 =

Protein-coding gene in the species Homo sapiens

Identifiers
- Aliases: ANKRD26, THC2, bA145E8.1, ankyrin repeat domain 26, ankyrin repeat domain containing 26
- External IDs: OMIM: 610855; MGI: 1917887; GeneCards: ANKRD26

Gene location (Human)
Chr.	Chromosome 10 (human)
Band	10p12.1	Start	26,973,793 bp
Band	10p12.1	End	27,100,494 bp

Gene location (Mouse)
Chr.	Chromosome 6 (mouse)
Band	6|6 F1	Start	118,478,269 bp
Band	6|6 F1	End	118,539,187 bp
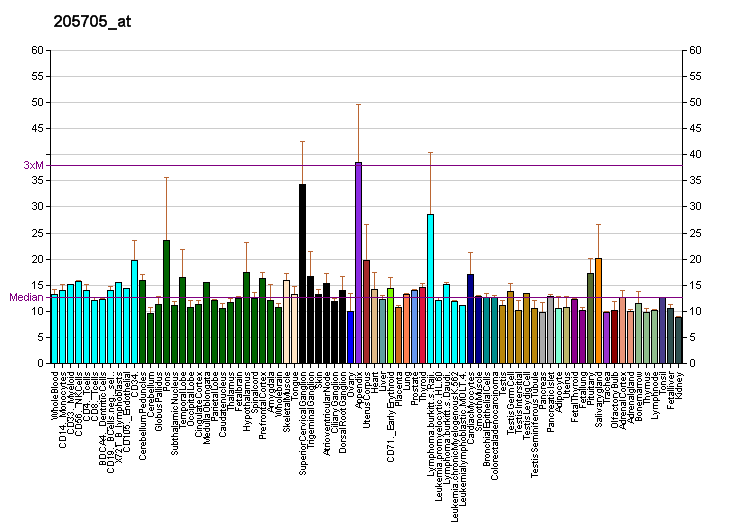

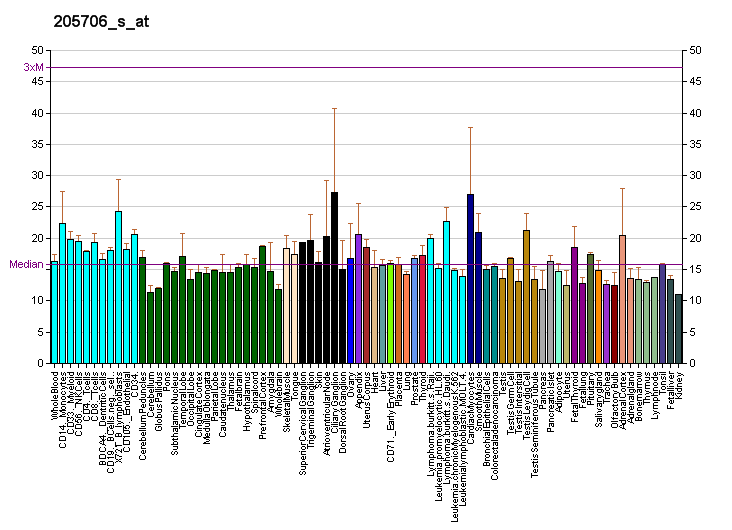
RNA expression pattern
Bgee	Human / Mouse (ortholog); Top expressed in: testicle; Achilles tendon; sural nerve; gonad; right uterine tube; ventricular zone; muscle of thigh; right hemisphere of cerebellum; anterior pituitary; gastrocnemius muscle / Top expressed in: tail of embryo; Rostral migratory stream; ciliary body; zygote; genital tubercle; secondary oocyte; ventromedial nucleus; neural layer of retina; primary oocyte; paraventricular nucleus of hypothalamus; More reference expression data
BioGPS	More reference expression data
Gene ontology
Molecular function	protein binding
Cellular component	centrosome
Biological process	negative regulation of fat cell differentiation
Sources:Amigo / QuickGO
Orthologs
Databases	NCBI: entry; OMA: entry
Species	Human	Mouse
Entrez	22852	232339
Ensembl	ENSG00000107890	ENSMUSG00000007827
UniProt	Q9UPS8	Q811D2
RefSeq (mRNA)	NM_001256053; NM_014915	NM_001081112
RefSeq (protein)	NP_001242982; NP_055730	NP_001074581
Location (UCSC)	Chr 10: 26.97 – 27.1 Mb	Chr 6: 118.48 – 118.54 Mb
PubMed search
- Wikidata
View/Edit Human	View/Edit Mouse

Ankyrin repeat domain-containing protein 26 is a protein that in humans is encoded by the ANKRD26 gene. This protein has a function that is not currently understood.

Ankyrin repeat domain-containing protein 26 is a protein that in humans is encoded by the ANKRD26 gene.

== Gene ==
ANKRD26 is found on chromosome 10, at 10q21. It has 6816 base pairs in the reference sequence mRNA transcript.

=== Neighborhood ===
LOC100289548 (PUTAETIVE UNCHARACTERIZED PROTEIN C10ORF52-LIKE) is located directly to the left (3') of ANKRD26, and is a protein coding gene located at 10p12.1. It has an unknown function. On the other side of LOC100289548 is NCRNA00202 non-protein coding RNA 202. On the 5' end of ANKRD26, YME1L1 can be found at 10q14.1. The protein encoded by the YME1-like 1 is an ortholog of yeast mitochondrial AAAmetalloprotease. This gene is thought to play a role in mitochondrial protein metabolism. On the positive strand of human chromosome ten, located next to the 5' end of ANKRD26 is MASTL, microtubule associated serine/threonine kinase-like. This particular gene encodes the microtubule associated serine/threonine kinase.1 Mutations within these gene have been expected to be associated with thrombocytopenia-2.

== Protein ==
Ankyrin repeat domain-containing protein 26 has three conserved domains: ANK, SbcC, and DUF3496. ANK conserved domain is located from amino acid 74–199. Ankyrin repeats are found to mediate protein-protein interactions, and also contains two antiparallel helices, as well as a beta-hairpin. SbcC conserved domain can be found from amino acid 743–1333, and is domain associated with ATPase involved in DNA repair. There is also a domain of unknown function from amino acid 1538–1649.

== Expression ==
In humans ANKRD26 was seen to be most highly expressed in the ear, lymph, esophagus, parathyroid, and placenta, as well as, most commonly seen in esophageal tumors and lymphoma, as well as seen in the blastocyst, fetus, juvenile, and adult developmental stages. In humans this is associated at all stages of life with lymphoma cancer as well as esophageal tumors. The association with expression in tissues and disease states doesn't show enough difference to link one another.
