= FEM1A =

Protein-coding gene in the species Homo sapiens

Identifiers
- Aliases: FEM1A, EPRAP, fem-1 homolog A
- External IDs: OMIM: 613538; MGI: 1335089; GeneCards: FEM1A

Gene location (Human)
Chr.	Chromosome 19 (human)
Band	19p13.3	Start	4,791,734 bp
Band	19p13.3	End	4,801,273 bp

Gene location (Mouse)
Chr.	Chromosome 17 (mouse)
Band	17 D|17 29.24 cM	Start	56,563,810 bp
Band	17 D|17 29.24 cM	End	56,570,610 bp
RNA expression pattern
Bgee	Human / Mouse (ortholog); Top expressed in: Skeletal muscle tissue of rectus abdominis; tibialis anterior muscle; quadriceps femoris muscle; vastus lateralis muscle; biceps brachii; Skeletal muscle tissue of biceps brachii; myocardium of left ventricle; deltoid muscle; body of tongue; cardiac muscle tissue of right atrium / Top expressed in: extensor digitorum longus muscle; plantaris muscle; muscle of thigh; cardiac muscle tissue of left ventricle; gastrocnemius muscle; triceps brachii muscle; medial head of gastrocnemius muscle; tibialis anterior muscle; temporal muscle; skeletal muscle tissue; More reference expression data
BioGPS	n/a
Gene ontology
Molecular function	EP4 subtype prostaglandin E2 receptor binding; ubiquitin-protein transferase activity
Cellular component	cytoplasm; cytosol
Biological process	negative regulation of inflammatory response; protein ubiquitination; regulation of ubiquitin-protein transferase activity; post-translational protein modification
Sources:Amigo / QuickGO
Orthologs
Databases	NCBI: entry; OMA: entry
Species	Human	Mouse
Entrez	55527	14154
Ensembl	ENSG00000141965	ENSMUSG00000043683
UniProt	Q9BSK4	Q9Z2G1
RefSeq (mRNA)	NM_018708	NM_010192
RefSeq (protein)	NP_061178	NP_034322
Location (UCSC)	Chr 19: 4.79 – 4.8 Mb	Chr 17: 56.56 – 56.57 Mb
PubMed search
- Wikidata
View/Edit Human	View/Edit Mouse

Fem-1 homolog A is a protein that in humans is encoded by the FEM1A gene.
