= PPP1R13B =

Protein-coding gene in the species Homo sapiens

Identifiers
- Aliases: PPP1R13B, ASPP1, p53BP2-like, p85, protein phosphatase 1 regulatory subunit 13B
- External IDs: OMIM: 606455; MGI: 1336199; GeneCards: PPP1R13B

Gene location (Human)
Chr.	Chromosome 14 (human)
Band	14q32.33	Start	103,733,195 bp
Band	14q32.33	End	103,847,575 bp

Gene location (Mouse)
Chr.	Chromosome 12 (mouse)
Band	12|12 F1	Start	111,794,891 bp
Band	12|12 F1	End	111,874,544 bp
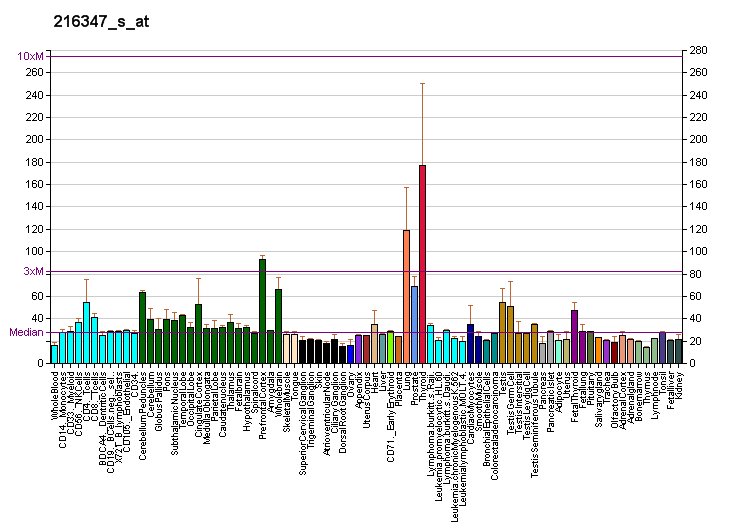
RNA expression pattern
Bgee	Human / Mouse (ortholog); Top expressed in: right lobe of thyroid gland; left lobe of thyroid gland; apex of heart; right hemisphere of cerebellum; left testis; right testis; right auricle of heart; left ventricle; Brodmann area 10; right frontal lobe / Top expressed in: retinal pigment epithelium; gastrula; decidua; otolith organ; renal corpuscle; utricle; lacrimal gland; facial motor nucleus; ciliary body; otic vesicle; More reference expression data
BioGPS	More reference expression data
Gene ontology
Molecular function	transcription factor binding; protein binding; p53 binding
Cellular component	plasma membrane; nucleus; mitochondrion; nucleoplasm; cytoplasm; cytosol; perinuclear region of cytoplasm
Biological process	negative regulation of cell cycle; intrinsic apoptotic signaling pathway by p53 class mediator; apoptotic process; regulation of signal transduction by p53 class mediator; regulation of apoptotic process; positive regulation of protein insertion into mitochondrial membrane involved in apoptotic signaling pathway; positive regulation of neuron death
Sources:Amigo / QuickGO
Orthologs
Databases	NCBI: entry; OMA: entry
Species	Human	Mouse
Entrez	23368	21981
Ensembl	ENSG00000088808	ENSMUSG00000021285
UniProt	Q96KQ4	Q62415
RefSeq (mRNA)	NM_015316	NM_011625
RefSeq (protein)	NP_056131	NP_035755
Location (UCSC)	Chr 14: 103.73 – 103.85 Mb	Chr 12: 111.79 – 111.87 Mb
PubMed search
- Wikidata
View/Edit Human	View/Edit Mouse

Apoptosis-stimulating of p53 protein 1 is a protein that in humans is encoded by the PPP1R13B gene.

This gene encodes a member of the ASPP (apoptosis-stimulating protein of p53) family of p53 interacting proteins. The protein contains four ankyrin repeats and an SH3 domain involved in protein-protein interactions. ASPP proteins are required for the induction of apoptosis by p53-family proteins. They promote DNA binding and transactivation of p53-family proteins on the promoters of proapoptotic genes. Expression of this gene is regulated by the E2F transcription factor.
