= Protein phosphatase 1 regulatory subunit 12C =

Protein-coding gene in the species Homo sapiens

PPP1R12C

Identifiers
- Aliases: PPP1R12C, LENG3, MBS85, p84, p85, protein phosphatase 1 regulatory subunit 12C, AAVS1
- External IDs: OMIM: 613245; MGI: 1924258; GeneCards: PPP1R12C

Gene location (Human)
Chr.	Chromosome 19 (human)
Band	19q13.42	Start	55,090,914 bp
Band	19q13.42	End	55,117,637 bp

Gene location (Mouse)
Chr.	Chromosome 7 (mouse)
Band	7|7 A1	Start	4,484,519 bp
Band	7|7 A1	End	4,504,679 bp
RNA expression pattern
Bgee	Human / Mouse (ortholog); Top expressed in: gastric mucosa; muscle layer of sigmoid colon; body of uterus; apex of heart; left testis; canal of the cervix; right testis; left uterine tube; popliteal artery; tibial arteries / Top expressed in: granulocyte; neural layer of retina; superior frontal gyrus; interventricular septum; lip; primary visual cortex; dentate gyrus of hippocampal formation granule cell; ventricular zone; cerebellar cortex; thymus; More reference expression data
BioGPS	n/a
Gene ontology
Molecular function	protein kinase binding; protein binding; phosphatase regulator activity; enzyme inhibitor activity
Cellular component	cytoplasm; cytoskeleton
Biological process	signal transduction; regulation of catalytic activity; negative regulation of catalytic activity
Sources:Amigo / QuickGO
Orthologs
Databases	NCBI: entry; OMA: entry
Species	Human	Mouse
Entrez	54776	232807
Ensembl	ENSG00000125503	ENSMUSG00000019254
UniProt	Q9BZL4	Q3UMT1
RefSeq (mRNA)	NM_001271618; NM_017607	NM_029834
RefSeq (protein)	NP_001258547; NP_060077	NP_084110
Location (UCSC)	Chr 19: 55.09 – 55.12 Mb	Chr 7: 4.48 – 4.5 Mb
PubMed search
- Wikidata
View/Edit Human	View/Edit Mouse

Protein phosphatase 1 regulatory subunit 12C is a protein that in humans is encoded by the PPP1R12C gene.

== Function ==
The gene encodes a subunit of myosin phosphatase. The encoded protein regulates the catalytic activity of protein phosphatase 1 delta and assembly of the actin cytoskeleton. Alternatively spliced transcript variants encoding multiple isoforms have been observed for this gene.
