= OSTF1 =

Protein-coding gene in the species Homo sapiens

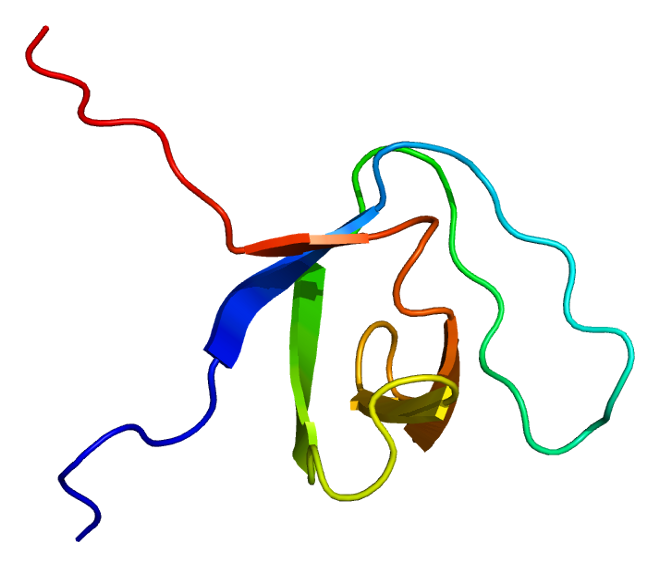

Identifiers
- Aliases: OSTF1, OSF, SH3P2, bA235O14.1, osteoclast stimulating factor 1
- External IDs: OMIM: 610180; MGI: 700012; GeneCards: OSTF1
Available structures
PDB	Ortholog search: PDBe RCSB
PDB	List of PDB id codes 1X2K, 1ZLM, 3EHQ, 3EHR

Gene location (Human)
Chr.	Chromosome 9 (human)
Band	9q21.13	Start	75,088,514 bp
Band	9q21.13	End	75,147,265 bp

Gene location (Mouse)
Chr.	Chromosome 19 (mouse)
Band	19 B|19 13.17 cM	Start	18,493,501 bp
Band	19 B|19 13.17 cM	End	18,609,187 bp
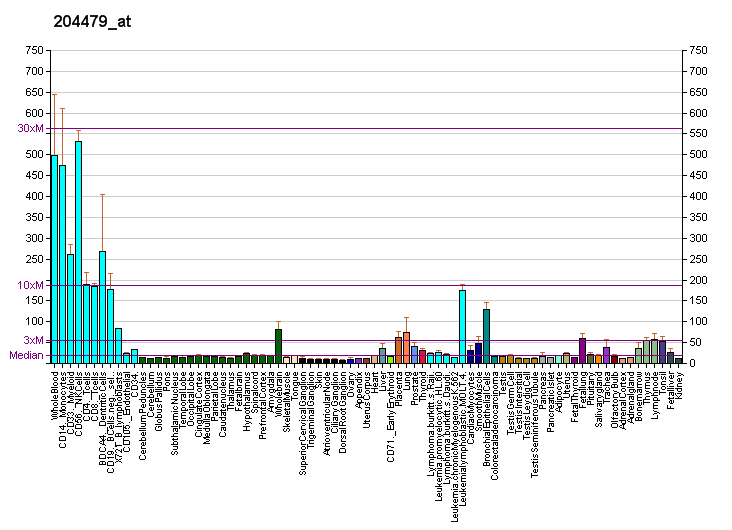
RNA expression pattern
Bgee	Human / Mouse (ortholog); Top expressed in: monocyte; granulocyte; blood; right lung; skin of abdomen; spleen; upper lobe of left lung; skin of leg; gallbladder; rectum / Top expressed in: granulocyte; stroma of bone marrow; decidua; right kidney; gastrula; spleen; Ileal epithelium; lip; corneal stroma; sciatic nerve; More reference expression data
BioGPS	More reference expression data
Gene ontology
Molecular function	SH3 domain binding; protein binding
Cellular component	cytoplasm; intracellular anatomical structure; secretory granule lumen; ficolin-1-rich granule lumen; extracellular region
Biological process	ossification; signal transduction; neutrophil degranulation
Sources:Amigo / QuickGO
Orthologs
Databases	NCBI: entry; OMA: entry
Species	Human	Mouse
Entrez	26578	20409
Ensembl	ENSG00000134996	ENSMUSG00000024725
UniProt	Q92882	Q62422
RefSeq (mRNA)	NM_012383	NM_017375
RefSeq (protein)	NP_036515	NP_059071
Location (UCSC)	Chr 9: 75.09 – 75.15 Mb	Chr 19: 18.49 – 18.61 Mb
PubMed search
- Wikidata
View/Edit Human	View/Edit Mouse

Osteoclast-stimulating factor 1 is a protein that in humans is encoded by the OSTF1 gene.
