= ABTB1 =

Protein-coding gene in the species Homo sapiens

Identifiers
- Aliases: ABTB1, BPOZ, BTB3, BTBD21, EF1ABP, PP2259, ankyrin repeat and BTB domain containing 1
- External IDs: OMIM: 608308; MGI: 1933148; GeneCards: ABTB1

Gene location (Human)
Chr.	Chromosome 3 (human)
Band	3q21.3	Start	127,672,935 bp
Band	3q21.3	End	127,680,926 bp

Gene location (Mouse)
Chr.	Chromosome 6 (mouse)
Band	6|6 D1	Start	88,812,896 bp
Band	6|6 D1	End	88,818,966 bp
RNA expression pattern
Bgee	Human / Mouse (ortholog); Top expressed in: right hemisphere of cerebellum; granulocyte; blood; spleen; apex of heart; tibial nerve; right lung; gastric mucosa; canal of the cervix; monocyte / Top expressed in: granulocyte; Jacobson's organ; blood; muscle of thigh; neural layer of retina; right kidney; spermatocyte; superior frontal gyrus; lip; proximal tubule; More reference expression data
BioGPS	n/a
Gene ontology
Molecular function	protein binding; translation elongation factor activity; ubiquitin protein ligase binding
Cellular component	plasma membrane; nucleolus; SCF ubiquitin ligase complex; cytoplasm; cytosol; ubiquitin ligase complex
Biological process	translational elongation; protein biosynthesis; proteasome-mediated ubiquitin-dependent protein catabolic process; regulation of proteolysis
Sources:Amigo / QuickGO
Orthologs
Databases	NCBI: entry; OMA: entry
Species	Human	Mouse
Entrez	80325	80283
Ensembl	ENSG00000114626	ENSMUSG00000030083
UniProt	Q969K4	Q99LJ2
RefSeq (mRNA)	NM_032548; NM_172027; NM_172028	NM_030251; NM_001362152
RefSeq (protein)	NP_115937; NP_742024	NP_084527; NP_001349081
Location (UCSC)	Chr 3: 127.67 – 127.68 Mb	Chr 6: 88.81 – 88.82 Mb
PubMed search
- Wikidata
View/Edit Human	View/Edit Mouse

Ankyrin repeat and BTB/POZ domain-containing protein 1 is a protein that in humans is encoded by the ABTB1 gene.

== Function ==
This gene encodes a protein with an ankyrin repeat region and two BTB/POZ domains, which are thought to be involved in protein-protein interactions. Expression of this gene is activated by the phosphatase and tensin homolog, a tumor suppressor. Alternate splicing results in three transcript variants encoding different isoforms.
