= ANKRD27 =

Protein-coding gene in the species Homo sapiens

Identifiers
- Aliases: ANKRD27, VARP, PP12899, ankyrin repeat domain 27
- External IDs: MGI: 2444103; GeneCards: ANKRD27
Available structures
| PDB | Ortholog search: PDBe RCSB |
| PDB | List of PDB id codes 4B93, 4CYM, 4CZ2 |

Gene location (Human)
| Chr. | Chromosome 19 (human) |
| Band | 19q13.11 | Start | 32,597,006 bp |
| Band | 19q13.11 | End | 32,676,597 bp |

Gene location (Mouse)
| Chr. | Chromosome 7 (mouse) |
| Band | 7|7 B2 | Start | 35,285,669 bp |
| Band | 7|7 B2 | End | 35,338,651 bp |
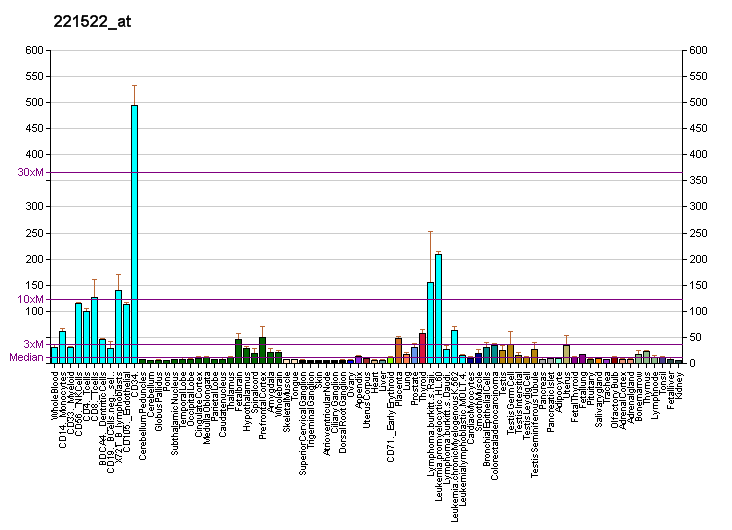
RNA expression pattern
| Bgee | Human / Mouse (ortholog); Top expressed in: Epithelium of choroid plexus; amniotic fluid; skin of thigh; palpebral conjunctiva; Brodmann area 23; tail of epididymis; seminal vesicula; epithelium of nasopharynx; lower lobe of lung; testicle / Top expressed in: neural layer of retina; ascending aorta; lacrimal gland; zygote; aortic valve; tail of embryo; lumbar spinal ganglion; parotid gland; epiblast; oocyte; More reference expression data |
| BioGPS | More reference expression data |
Gene ontology
| Molecular function | GTPase activator activity; guanyl-nucleotide exchange factor activity; protein binding; SNARE binding |
| Cellular component | endosome; late endosome; membrane; melanosome; plasma membrane; transport vesicle; tubular endosome; early endosome; lysosome; cytoplasmic vesicle membrane; cytoplasmic vesicle; cytosol; neuron projection |
| Biological process | negative regulation of SNARE complex assembly; early endosome to late endosome transport; positive regulation of dendrite morphogenesis; endosome to melanosome transport; protein transport; positive regulation of GTPase activity; neuron projection morphogenesis; transport; regulation of molecular function; positive regulation of neuron projection development |
Sources:Amigo / QuickGO
Orthologs
| Databases | NCBI: entry; OMA: entry |
| Species | Human | Mouse |
| Entrez | 84079 | 245886 |
| Ensembl | ENSG00000105186 | ENSMUSG00000034867 |
| UniProt | Q96NW4 | Q3UMR0 |
| RefSeq (mRNA) | NM_032139 | NM_145633; NM_178263; NM_001358876 |
| RefSeq (protein) | NP_115515 | NP_663608; NP_839994; NP_001345805 |
| Location (UCSC) | Chr 19: 32.6 – 32.68 Mb | Chr 7: 35.29 – 35.34 Mb |
| PubMed search |
- Wikidata
| View/Edit Human | View/Edit Mouse |

Ankyrin repeat domain-containing protein 27 is a protein that in humans is encoded by the ANKRD27 gene.
