= ASZ1 =

Protein-coding gene in the species Homo sapiens

Identifiers
- Aliases: ASZ1, ALP1, ANKL1, C7orf7, CT1.19, GASZ, Orf3, ankyrin repeat, SAM and basic leucine zipper domain containing 1
- External IDs: OMIM: 605797; MGI: 1921318; GeneCards: ASZ1

Gene location (Human)
Chr.	Chromosome 7 (human)
Band	7q31.2	Start	117,363,222 bp
Band	7q31.2	End	117,428,123 bp

Gene location (Mouse)
Chr.	Chromosome 6 (mouse)
Band	6|6 A2	Start	18,050,963 bp
Band	6|6 A2	End	18,109,060 bp
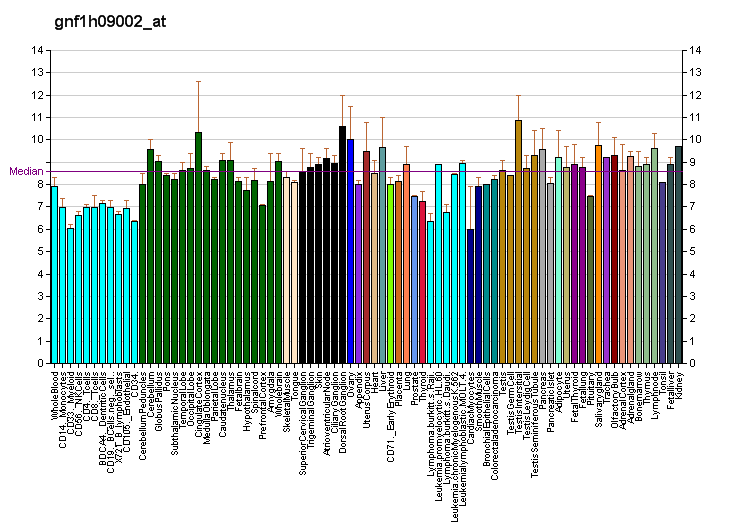
RNA expression pattern
Bgee	Human / Mouse (ortholog); Top expressed in: testicle; gonad; right testis; left testis; buccal mucosa cell; corpus callosum; sperm; stromal cell of endometrium; lower lobe of lung; granulocyte / Top expressed in: spermatocyte; primary oocyte; zygote; secondary oocyte; spermatid; seminiferous tubule; Gonadal ridge; left lung lobe; morula; urethra; More reference expression data
BioGPS	More reference expression data
Gene ontology
Molecular function	signal transducer activity
Cellular component	cytoplasm; pi-body
Biological process	male meiotic nuclear division; multicellular organism development; cell differentiation; meiosis; spermatogenesis; DNA methylation involved in gamete generation; gene silencing; signal transduction; piRNA metabolic process
Sources:Amigo / QuickGO
Orthologs
Databases	NCBI: entry; OMA: entry
Species	Human	Mouse
Entrez	136991	74068
Ensembl	ENSG00000154438	ENSMUSG00000010796
UniProt	Q8WWH4; Q49AP3	Q8VD46
RefSeq (mRNA)	NM_001301821; NM_001301822; NM_130768	NM_023729
RefSeq (protein)	NP_001288750; NP_001288751; NP_570124	NP_076218
Location (UCSC)	Chr 7: 117.36 – 117.43 Mb	Chr 6: 18.05 – 18.11 Mb
PubMed search
- Wikidata
View/Edit Human	View/Edit Mouse

Ankyrin repeat, SAM and basic leucine zipper domain-containing protein 1 is a protein that in humans is encoded by the ASZ1 gene.
