= Ankyrin repeat domain 22 =

Protein-coding gene in the species Homo sapiens

ANKRD22

Identifiers
- Aliases: ANKRD22, Ankrd22, 5430429D21Rik, D19Ertd675e, ankyrin repeat domain 22
- External IDs: MGI: 1277101; GeneCards: ANKRD22

Gene location (Human)
Chr.	Chromosome 10 (human)
Band	10q23.31	Start	88,819,896 bp
Band	10q23.31	End	88,851,844 bp

Gene location (Mouse)
Chr.	Chromosome 19 (mouse)
Band	19 C1|19 29.33 cM	Start	34,098,869 bp
Band	19 C1|19 29.33 cM	End	34,143,453 bp
RNA expression pattern
Bgee	Human / Mouse (ortholog); Top expressed in: skin of arm; skin of thigh; gingival epithelium; vulva; oral cavity; human penis; mucosa of sigmoid colon; buccal mucosa cell; skin of abdomen; skin of hip / Top expressed in: granulocyte; transitional epithelium of urinary bladder; esophagus; lip; skin of external ear; zygote; skin of back; conjunctival fornix; cornea; skin of abdomen; More reference expression data
BioGPS	n/a
Orthologs
Databases	NCBI: entry; OMA: entry
Species	Human	Mouse
Entrez	118932	52024
Ensembl	ENSG00000152766	ENSMUSG00000024774
UniProt	Q5VYY1	Q9D3J5
RefSeq (mRNA)	NM_144590	NM_024204
RefSeq (protein)	NP_653191	NP_077166
Location (UCSC)	Chr 10: 88.82 – 88.85 Mb	Chr 19: 34.1 – 34.14 Mb
PubMed search
- Wikidata
View/Edit Human	View/Edit Mouse

Ankyrin repeat domain 22 is a protein that in humans is encoded by the ANKRD22 gene.
