= ACAP2 =

Protein-coding gene in the species Homo sapiens

Identifiers
- Aliases: ACAP2, CENTB2, CNT-B2, ArfGAP with coiled-coil, ankyrin repeat and PH domains 2
- External IDs: OMIM: 607766; MGI: 1925868; GeneCards: ACAP2

Gene location (Human)
Chr.	Chromosome 3 (human)
Band	3q29	Start	195,274,745 bp
Band	3q29	End	195,443,044 bp

Gene location (Mouse)
Chr.	Chromosome 16 (mouse)
Band	16|16 B2	Start	30,911,230 bp
Band	16|16 B2	End	31,020,063 bp
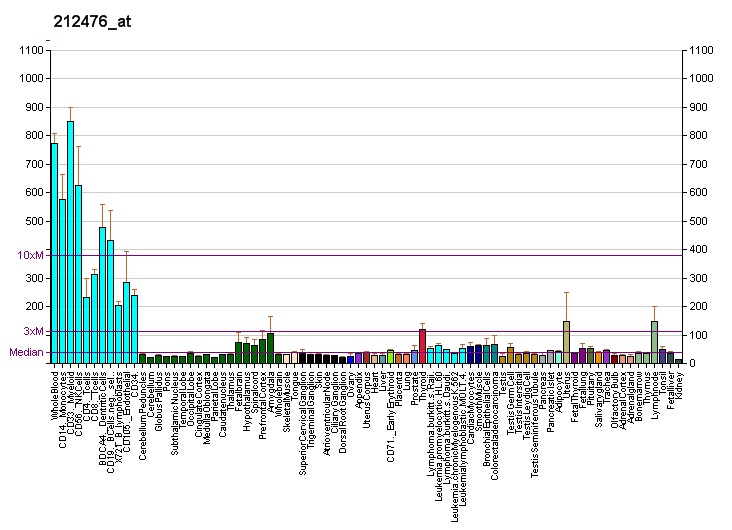
RNA expression pattern
Bgee	Human / Mouse (ortholog); Top expressed in: epithelium of nasopharynx; bone marrow cell; superficial temporal artery; trabecular bone; human penis; Achilles tendon; palpebral conjunctiva; jejunal mucosa; oral cavity; mucosa of paranasal sinus / Top expressed in: stroma of bone marrow; superior cervical ganglion; left lung lobe; transitional epithelium of urinary bladder; otic vesicle; visual cortex; primary visual cortex; conjunctival fornix; hand; skin of external ear; More reference expression data
BioGPS	More reference expression data
Gene ontology
Molecular function	metal ion binding; GTPase activator activity; phosphatidylinositol-3,5-bisphosphate binding
Cellular component	endosome; endosome membrane; membrane
Biological process	protein localization to endosome; positive regulation of GTPase activity; cellular response to nerve growth factor stimulus; endocytic recycling
Sources:Amigo / QuickGO
Orthologs
Databases	NCBI: entry; OMA: entry
Species	Human	Mouse
Entrez	23527	78618
Ensembl	ENSG00000114331	ENSMUSG00000049076
UniProt	Q15057	Q6ZQK5
RefSeq (mRNA)	NM_012287	NM_030138
RefSeq (protein)	NP_036419	NP_084414
Location (UCSC)	Chr 3: 195.27 – 195.44 Mb	Chr 16: 30.91 – 31.02 Mb
PubMed search
- Wikidata
View/Edit Human	View/Edit Mouse

Arf-GAP with coiled-coil, ANK repeat and PH domain-containing protein 2 is a protein that in humans is encoded by the ACAP2 gene.
