= ASB3 =

Protein-coding gene in humans

Identifiers
- Aliases: ASB3, ASB-3, ankyrin repeat and SOCS box containing 3
- External IDs: OMIM: 605760; MGI: 1929749; GeneCards: ASB3

Gene location (Human)
Chr.	Chromosome 2 (human)
Band	2p16.2	Start	53,532,672 bp
Band	2p16.2	End	53,860,160 bp

Gene location (Mouse)
Chr.	Chromosome 11 (mouse)
Band	11 A4|11 18.19 cM	Start	30,835,416 bp
Band	11 A4|11 18.19 cM	End	31,052,704 bp
RNA expression pattern
Bgee	Human / Mouse (ortholog); Top expressed in: secondary oocyte; ventricular zone; ganglionic eminence; middle temporal gyrus; endothelial cell; tibia; corpus callosum; entorhinal cortex; testicle; postcentral gyrus / Top expressed in: spermatocyte; endocardial cushion; medial ganglionic eminence; granulocyte; spermatid; ventricular zone; cumulus cell; otic placode; lumbar spinal ganglion; genital tubercle; More reference expression data
BioGPS	n/a
Gene ontology
Molecular function	protein binding; ubiquitin protein ligase binding; ubiquitin-protein transferase activity
Cellular component	cytoplasm; nucleus; ubiquitin ligase complex; cytosol
Biological process	protein ubiquitination; intracellular signal transduction; post-translational protein modification
Sources:Amigo / QuickGO
Orthologs
Databases	NCBI: entry; OMA: entry
Species	Human	Mouse
Entrez	51130	65257
Ensembl	ENSG00000115239	ENSMUSG00000020305
UniProt	Q9Y575	Q9WV72
RefSeq (mRNA)	NM_145863; NM_001201965; NM_016115	NM_023906
RefSeq (protein)	NP_001157637	NP_076395
Location (UCSC)	Chr 2: 53.53 – 53.86 Mb	Chr 11: 30.84 – 31.05 Mb
PubMed search
- Wikidata
View/Edit Human	View/Edit Mouse

Ankyrin repeat and SOCS box protein 3 is a protein that in humans is encoded by the ASB3 gene.

The protein encoded by this gene is a member of the ankyrin repeat and SOCS box-containing (ASB) family of proteins. They contain ankyrin repeat sequence and SOCS box domain. The SOCS box serves to couple suppressor of cytokine signalling (SOCS) proteins and their binding partners with the elongin B and C complex, possibly targeting them for degradation. Multiple alternatively spliced transcript variants have been described for this gene but some of the full length sequences are not known.
