= ANKRD33 =

Protein-coding gene in humans

Identifiers
- Aliases: ANKRD33, C12orf7, PANKY, ankyrin repeat domain 33
- External IDs: MGI: 2443398; GeneCards: ANKRD33

Gene location (Human)
Chr.	Chromosome 12 (human)
Band	12q13.13	Start	51,888,009 bp
Band	12q13.13	End	51,891,727 bp

Gene location (Mouse)
Chr.	Chromosome 15 (mouse)
Band	15|15 F1	Start	101,013,636 bp
Band	15|15 F1	End	101,017,921 bp
RNA expression pattern
Bgee	Human / Mouse (ortholog); Top expressed in: gonad; placenta; retinal pigment epithelium; buccal mucosa cell; stromal cell of endometrium; tibial nerve; islet of Langerhans; exocrine gland; liver; right frontal lobe / Top expressed in: neural layer of retina; outer nuclear layer; epithelium of lens; motor neuron; pineal gland; retinal pigment epithelium; granulocyte; lumbar spinal ganglion; inner nuclear layer; central gray substance of midbrain; More reference expression data
BioGPS	n/a
Orthologs
Databases	NCBI: entry; OMA: entry
Species	Human	Mouse
Entrez	341405	208258
Ensembl	ENSG00000167612	ENSMUSG00000047034
UniProt	Q7Z3H0; Q0VAA8	Q8BXP5
RefSeq (mRNA)	NM_001130015; NM_001304459; NM_001304460; NM_182608	NM_144790; NM_001355656; NM_001374225
RefSeq (protein)	NP_001123487; NP_001291388; NP_001291389; NP_872414; NP_001123487.1 NP_001291388.1; NP_001291389.1; NP_872414.3	NP_659039; NP_001342585; NP_001361154
Location (UCSC)	Chr 12: 51.89 – 51.89 Mb	Chr 15: 101.01 – 101.02 Mb
PubMed search
- Wikidata
View/Edit Human	View/Edit Mouse

Ankyrin repeat domain 33 is a protein that in humans is encoded by the ANKRD33 gene.
