= ANKS4B =

Protein-coding gene in humans

Identifiers
- Aliases: ANKS4B, HARP, ankyrin repeat and sterile alpha motif domain containing 4B
- External IDs: OMIM: 609901; MGI: 1919324; GeneCards: ANKS4B

Gene location (Human)
| Chr. | Chromosome 16 (human) |
| Band | 16p12.2 | Start | 21,233,699 bp |
| Band | 16p12.2 | End | 21,253,850 bp |

Gene location (Mouse)
| Chr. | Chromosome 7 (mouse) |
| Band | 7 F2|7 64.45 cM | Start | 119,773,081 bp |
| Band | 7 F2|7 64.45 cM | End | 119,784,809 bp |
RNA expression pattern
| Bgee | Human / Mouse (ortholog); Top expressed in: mucosa of transverse colon; duodenum; rectum; liver; right lobe of liver; testicle; human kidney; gallbladder; epithelium of colon; islet of Langerhans / Top expressed in: jejunum; ileum; epithelium of small intestine; zygote; duodenum; colon; left colon; left lobe of liver; secondary oocyte; human kidney; More reference expression data |
| BioGPS | n/a |
Gene ontology
| Molecular function | protein binding |
| Cellular component | plasma membrane; endoplasmic reticulum membrane; brush border; cell projection; microvillus |
| Biological process | protein localization to microvillus; response to endoplasmic reticulum stress; cell differentiation; brush border assembly |
Sources:Amigo / QuickGO
Orthologs
| Databases | NCBI: entry; OMA: entry |
| Species | Human | Mouse |
| Entrez | 257629 | 72074 |
| Ensembl | ENSG00000175311 | ENSMUSG00000030909 |
| UniProt | Q8N8V4 | Q8K3X6 |
| RefSeq (mRNA) | NM_145865 | NM_028085 |
| RefSeq (protein) | NP_665872 | NP_082361 |
| Location (UCSC) | Chr 16: 21.23 – 21.25 Mb | Chr 7: 119.77 – 119.78 Mb |
| PubMed search |
- Wikidata
| View/Edit Human | View/Edit Mouse |

Ankyrin repeat and sterile alpha motif domain containing 4B is a protein that in humans is encoded by the ANKS4B gene. The gene is also known as HARP (Harmonin-interacting, ankyrin repeat-containing protein). Ankyrin repeats mediate protein-protein interactions in very diverse families of proteins.
