= UACA =

Protein-coding gene in the species Homo sapiens

Identifiers
- Aliases: UACA, NUCLING, uveal autoantigen with coiled-coil domains and ankyrin repeats
- External IDs: OMIM: 612516; MGI: 1919815; GeneCards: UACA

Gene location (Human)
Chr.	Chromosome 15 (human)
Band	15q23	Start	70,654,554 bp
Band	15q23	End	70,763,558 bp

Gene location (Mouse)
Chr.	Chromosome 9 (mouse)
Band	9|9 B	Start	60,701,824 bp
Band	9|9 B	End	60,787,652 bp
RNA expression pattern
Bgee	Human / Mouse (ortholog); Top expressed in: Achilles tendon; pancreatic ductal cell; sural nerve; cardia; renal medulla; ventral tegmental area; pylorus; nipple; trigeminal ganglion; subthalamic nucleus / Top expressed in: otolith organ; ankle; utricle; muscle of thigh; tibialis anterior muscle; lumbar spinal ganglion; esophagus; medial head of gastrocnemius muscle; skeletal muscle tissue; knee joint; More reference expression data
BioGPS	n/a
Gene ontology
Molecular function	protein binding; molecular function
Cellular component	extracellular region; extracellular exosome; cytoskeleton; nucleus; cytoplasm; cytosol
Biological process	apoptotic signaling pathway; regulation of NIK/NF-kappaB signaling; biological process
Sources:Amigo / QuickGO
Orthologs
Databases	NCBI: entry; OMA: entry
Species	Human	Mouse
Entrez	55075	72565
Ensembl	ENSG00000137831	ENSMUSG00000034485
UniProt	Q9BZF9	Q8CGB3
RefSeq (mRNA)	NM_001008224; NM_018003	NM_028283; NM_001357407; NM_001357408
RefSeq (protein)	NP_001008225; NP_060473	NP_082559; NP_001344336; NP_001344337
Location (UCSC)	Chr 15: 70.65 – 70.76 Mb	Chr 9: 60.7 – 60.79 Mb
PubMed search
- Wikidata
View/Edit Human	View/Edit Mouse

Uveal autoantigen with coiled-coil domains and ankyrin repeats is a protein that in humans is encoded by the UACA gene. Diseases associated with UACA include Graves' Disease. Among its related pathways are signaling by Rho GTPases and Intrinsic Pathway for Apoptosis. An important paralog of this gene is ANKRD24.
