= LRRK1 =

Protein-coding gene in the species Homo sapiens

Identifiers
- Aliases: LRRK1, RIPK6, Roco1, leucine-rich repeat kinase 1, leucine rich repeat kinase 1, OSMD
- External IDs: OMIM: 610986; MGI: 2142227; GeneCards: LRRK1
Enzyme activity
EC #	BRENDA	ExPASy	KEGG	MetaCyc
2.7.11.1	↗	↗	↗	↗

Gene location (Human)
Chr.	Chromosome 15 (human)
Band	15q26.3	Start	100,919,327 bp
Band	15q26.3	End	101,078,257 bp

Gene location (Mouse)
Chr.	Chromosome 7 (mouse)
Band	7|7 C	Start	65,876,660 bp
Band	7|7 C	End	66,038,098 bp
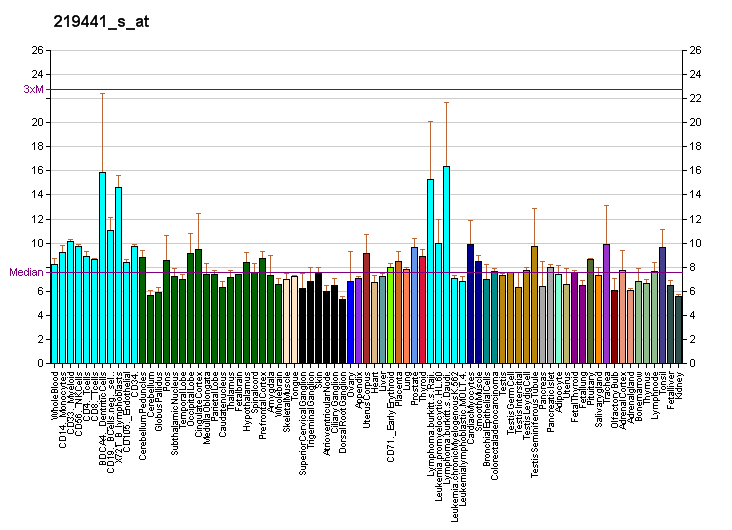
RNA expression pattern
Bgee	Human / Mouse (ortholog); Top expressed in: lymph node; appendix; transverse colon; spleen; monocyte; mucosa of transverse colon; minor salivary glands; skin of leg; rectum; stromal cell of endometrium / Top expressed in: right lung lobe; transitional epithelium of urinary bladder; left lung; medullary collecting duct; left lung lobe; endothelial cell of lymphatic vessel; conjunctival fornix; mesenteric lymph nodes; stroma of bone marrow; epithelium of stomach; More reference expression data
BioGPS	More reference expression data
Gene ontology
Molecular function	kinase activity; transferase activity; nucleotide binding; protein kinase activity; GTP binding; protein binding; ATP binding; metal ion binding; identical protein binding; protein serine/threonine kinase activity; signal transducer activity
Cellular component	mitochondrion; cytoplasm; cytosol
Biological process	positive regulation of canonical Wnt signaling pathway; osteoclast development; negative regulation of peptidyl-tyrosine phosphorylation; positive regulation of intracellular signal transduction; bone resorption; phosphorylation; positive regulation of peptidyl-tyrosine phosphorylation; intracellular signal transduction; protein phosphorylation
Sources:Amigo / QuickGO
Orthologs
Databases	NCBI: entry; OMA: entry
Species	Human	Mouse
Entrez	79705	233328
Ensembl	ENSG00000154237	ENSMUSG00000015133
UniProt	Q38SD2	Q3UHC2
RefSeq (mRNA)	NM_024652; NM_001039843	NM_146191
RefSeq (protein)	NP_078928	NP_666303
Location (UCSC)	Chr 15: 100.92 – 101.08 Mb	Chr 7: 65.88 – 66.04 Mb
PubMed search
- Wikidata
View/Edit Human	View/Edit Mouse

Leucine-rich repeat serine/threonine-protein kinase 1 is an enzyme that in humans is encoded by the LRRK1 gene.
