= AGAP3 =

Protein-coding gene in the species Homo sapiens

Identifiers
- Aliases: AGAP3, AGAP-3, CENTG3, CRAG, MRIP-1, cnt-g3, ArfGAP with GTPase domain, ankyrin repeat and PH domain 3
- External IDs: OMIM: 616813; MGI: 2183446; GeneCards: AGAP3
Available structures
PDB	Ortholog search: PDBe RCSB
PDB	List of PDB id codes 3IHW

Gene location (Human)
Chr.	Chromosome 7 (human)
Band	7q36.1	Start	151,085,831 bp
Band	7q36.1	End	151,144,436 bp

Gene location (Mouse)
Chr.	Chromosome 5 (mouse)
Band	5|5 A3	Start	24,657,175 bp
Band	5|5 A3	End	24,707,045 bp
RNA expression pattern
Bgee	Human / Mouse (ortholog); Top expressed in: right hemisphere of cerebellum; right frontal lobe; Brodmann area 9; cingulate gyrus; anterior cingulate cortex; prefrontal cortex; amygdala; hypothalamus; nucleus accumbens; anterior pituitary / Top expressed in: superior frontal gyrus; dentate gyrus of hippocampal formation granule cell; primary visual cortex; neural layer of retina; ventricular zone; lip; muscle of thigh; cerebellar cortex; otic vesicle; saccule; More reference expression data
BioGPS	n/a
Gene ontology
Molecular function	nucleotide binding; GTP binding; metal ion binding; GTPase activator activity; GTPase activity; polyubiquitin modification-dependent protein binding
Cellular component	membrane; nucleus; cytoplasm; cell periphery
Biological process	positive regulation of GTPase activity; signal transduction; cellular response to reactive oxygen species; proteasome-mediated ubiquitin-dependent protein catabolic process
Sources:Amigo / QuickGO
Orthologs
Databases	NCBI: entry; OMA: entry
Species	Human	Mouse
Entrez	116988	213990
Ensembl	ENSG00000133612	ENSMUSG00000023353
UniProt	Q96P47; Q86ST5	Q8VHH5
RefSeq (mRNA)	NM_001042535; NM_001281300; NM_001308304; NM_001308305; NM_031946 NM_001350102; NM_001350103; NM_001350104	NM_001256431; NM_139153; NM_001359881
RefSeq (protein)	NP_001036000; NP_001268229; NP_001295233; NP_001295234; NP_114152 NP_001337031; NP_001337032; NP_001337033; NP_001036000.1; NP_001295233.1; NP_001295234.1	n/a
Location (UCSC)	Chr 7: 151.09 – 151.14 Mb	Chr 5: 24.66 – 24.71 Mb
PubMed search
- Wikidata
View/Edit Human	View/Edit Mouse

Arf-GAP with GTPase, ANK repeat and PH domain-containing protein 3 is an enzyme that in humans is encoded by the AGAP3 gene.
