= Hypohidrotic ectodermal dysplasia with immune deficiency =

- This condition is usually inherited in an X-linked recessive manner
- Specialty: Medical genetics

Hypohidrotic/anhidrotic ectodermal dysplasia with immune deficiency is a rare genetic condition characterized by a combination of the features of ectodermal dysplasia alongside immunodeficiency.

== Signs and symptoms ==
Individuals with this condition typically exhibit a milder version of the symptoms that patients with another type of ectodermal dysplasia would display, these include:

- Sparse to no hair throughout the body (hypotrichosis/atrichia)
- Dysplastic (malformed), hypoplastic (underdeveloped), or aplastic (missing) teeth
- Little to no ability to sweat (hypo/anhidrosis)
- Frontal bossing (prominence of the forehead)
- Wrinkling under the eyes
- Periorbital hyperpigmentation

These symptoms are accompanied by an immunodeficiency that affects the entire body and impairs the body's antibody response (especially that to polysaccharides). It causes various complications in and on itself, alongside a failure to thrive.

== Complications ==
Most complications exhibited by people with the condition are associated with the immunodeficiency that is characteristic of it. These complications include:

- Hypogammaglobulinemia
- Recurrent infections (most of which are severe)
  - Recurrent respiratory tract infections
    - Recurrent bronchiectasis
  - Recurrent digestive tract infections
    - Moderate to severe diarrhea
    - Recurrent ulcers
  - Recurrent skin infections
- Increased susceptibility to autoimmune disorders
- Impairments of natural killer cell cytotoxicity.

Early death (usually in infancy) can occur as a complication in some cases.

== Genetics ==
This condition has two known genetic causes, and both genetic causes have different inheritance patterns:

=== IKBKG ===
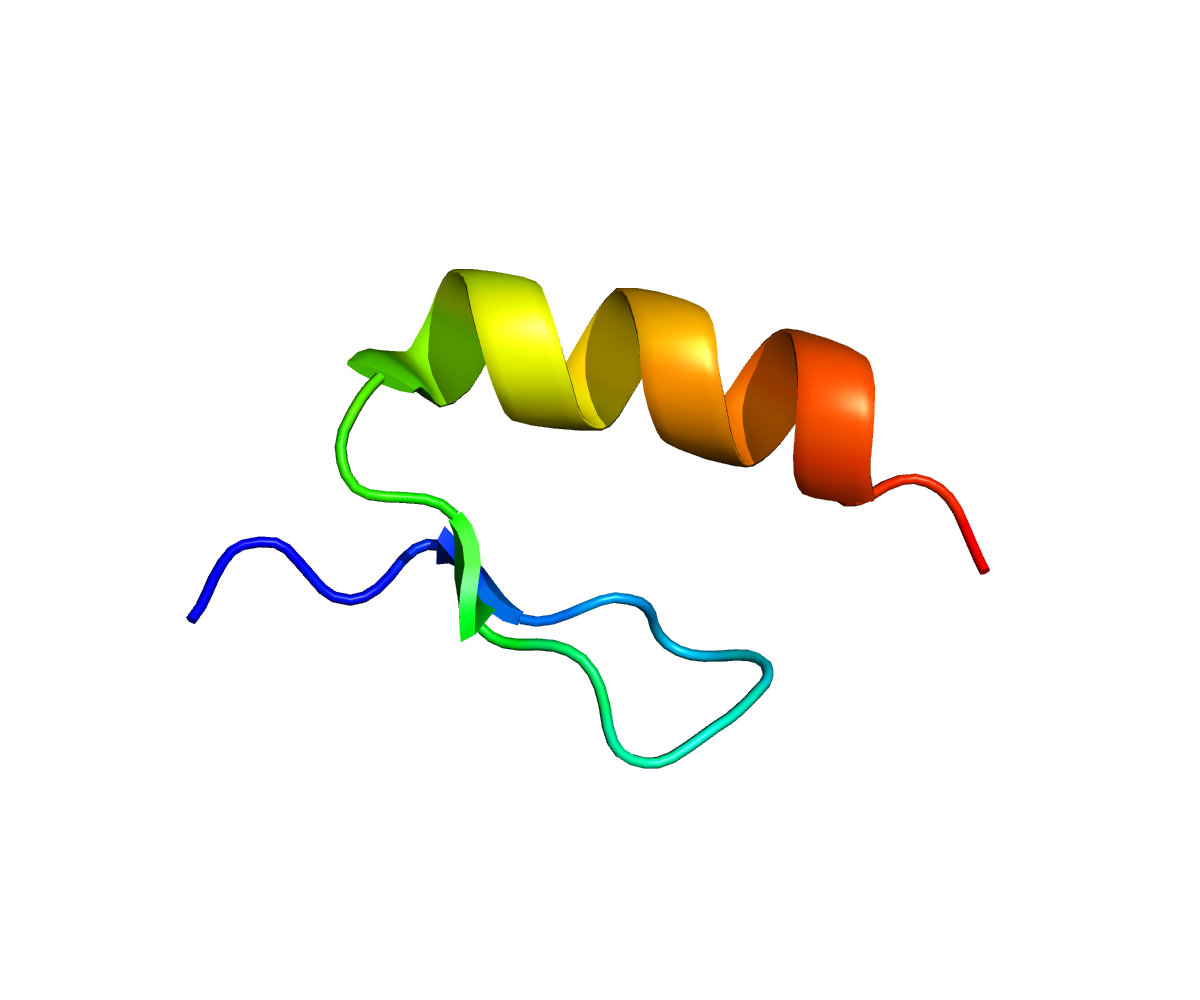
The NF-kappa-B essential modulator protein, produced by the IKBKG gene

The first cause (and most common out of the 2) is a genetic mutation in the IKBKG gene, located in the X chromosome at the q28 locus.

The protein that is encoded by this gene serves as the regulatory subunit of the inhibitor of IκB kinase (IKK) complex, it helps activate NF-κB, which in turn activates multiple genes that play an important role in inflammation, immunity, cell survival, and other pathways.

The mutation involved in this disorder significantly alters the function of the NF-kappa-B essential modulator protein, this impairs the protein's ability of regulating itself. It's this impairment that causes the interruption of various signaling pathways within the cells that form ectodermal tissue and the immune cells, this disruption causes the abnormal/poor development of ectodermal tissues and the immunodeficiency characteristic of this condition. Whether or not the condition is severe is determined by the amount of appropriate function the protein can perform on itself, loss-of-function mutations of the gene can cause antenatal male lethality.

This mutation is inherited following an X-linked recessive pattern, which means that for a person to exhibit the symptoms of the condition, they must have inherited a copy of the malfunctioning gene in all of their copies of the X chromosome. For this reason, the condition affects males more than it affects females, this is due to the fact that females carry two copies of the X chromosome, one of which may carry a healthy copy of the gene, while men on the other hand carry only one copy of the X chromosome, the other copy being the Y chromosome they inherited from their fathers; if they inherit the malfunctioning copy of the gene in their only X chromosome, they will automatically be homozygous for the disease and thus they will have the symptoms of the syndrome. Since males inherit one copy of the X chromosome from their mother and one copy of the Y chromosome from their father, the condition can only be inherited maternally. Females who do end up inheriting a malfunctioning copy of the gene will be heterozygous, which in turn will leave them as unaffected carriers.

=== NFKBIA ===
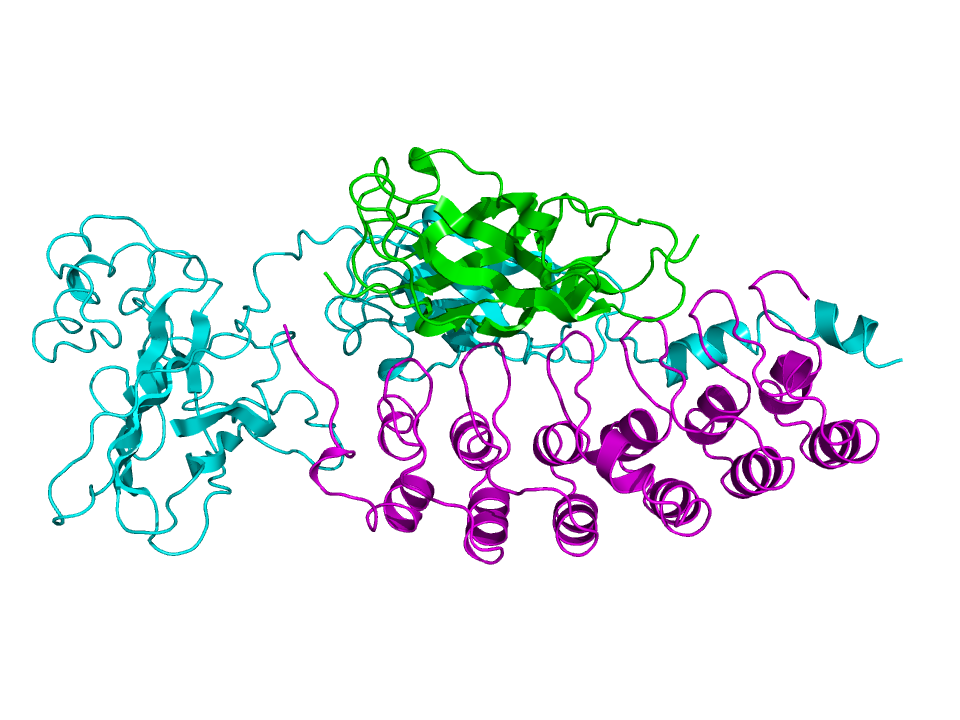
The nuclear factor of kappa light polypeptide gene enhancer in B-cells inhibitor, alpha protein, produced by the NKFBIA gene

The second cause (and least common out of the 2) is a genetic mutation in the NFKBIA gene, located in chromosome 14 at the q13.2 locus.

The protein that is encoded by this gene inhibits the NF-κB transcription factor through the masking of nuclear localization signals from NF-κB transcription factor proteins, this process keeps them in an inactive state in the cytoplasm. It also helps blocking the NF-κB transcription factors protein's ability of binding itself to DNA. The latter process is essential for the protein's appropriate functioning.

The way this mutation works is almost exactly the same as the way of the previously mentioned mutation works, however, a key difference between this mutation and the aforementioned one is that it is inherited following an autosomal dominant manner.

Autosomal dominant inheritance means that for a condition to exhibit itself on a person, said person needs to have at least one copy of the mutated version of the gene, this copy had to either appear spontaneously (a phenomenon known as de novo mutation) or it had to be inherited from one of the person's parents.

== Diagnosis ==
This condition can be diagnosed through methods such as genetic testing (encompassing terms such as whole exome sequencing, Sanger sequencing, etc.), routine laboratory tests, and physical examination.

== Treatment ==
Bone marrow transplants have been reported as being both successful and unsuccessful at managing the symptoms caused by the disorder. The latter (unsuccessful transplants) are usually not efficient at treating symptoms due to the transplants themselves causing post-surgical complications and, in some cases, death.

== Prevalence ==
The X-linked recessive form of HHED-I has an estimated incidence of about 1 out of every 250,000 live births.

The autosomal dominant form of HHED-I only has 13 to 27 cases reported in medical literature as of September 2022 (source: OMIM).

== History ==
This condition was first discovered in 2000, by Zonana et al, when they described various male individuals belonging to 4 unrelated families. Said individuals showed signs of ectodermal dysplasia (with symptoms such as teeth dysplasia, poor ability of sweating, and, in some cases, sparse hair) and had presented to various doctor visits since the early years of their life due to recurrent bacterial infections and their complications. Laboratory studies showed increased levels of IgM, low levels of IgA, equally low levels of IgG, and dysgammaglobulinemia. Tests done on their immunological responses showed an absent antibody response to pneumonoccal infections, while their body's response to tetanus was normal. Genetic tests done on the males revealed a loss-of-function mutation in exon 10 of their IKBKG gene, the mutation was present in a hemizygous state. The most severely affected patients were 2 brothers from the fourth family in the study, who had died at the age of 3 years old after a strong viral infection which their body got overwhelmed with.

The autosomal dominant variant of this condition was discovered in 2003 by Courtois et al, their patient was a 7-year-old male child born to healthy, unrelated non-consanguineous parents. He had infancy-onset chronic diarrhea, hepatosplenomegaly, failure to thrive, recurrent bronchopnemonitis, presence of moderately sparse hair of the scalp, conical teeth, and rough dry skin. After having genetic testing done on him, it was found that he carried a missense gain-of-function mutation in serine 32 of his NFKBIA gene, the mutation was present in a heterozygous state. He had a successful bone marrow transplant, with the bone marrow having been donated by his (unaffected) sister, and as total donor chimerism set in his blood cells, his body's immune responses improved in quality.
