= NEMO deficiency syndrome =

Rare type of immunodeficiency disease

Nuclear factor-kappa B Essential Modulator (NEMO) deficiency syndrome is a rare type of primary immunodeficiency disease that has a highly variable set of symptoms and prognoses. It mainly affects the skin and immune system but has the potential to affect all parts of the body, including the lungs, urinary tract and gastrointestinal tract. It is a monogenetic disease caused by mutation in the IKBKG gene (IKKγ, also known as the NF-κB essential modulator, or NEMO). NEMO is the modulator protein in the IKK inhibitor complex that, when activated, phosphorylates the inhibitor of the NF-κB transcription factors allowing for the translocation of transcription factors into the nucleus.

The link between IKBKG mutations and NEMO deficiency was identified in 1999. IKBKG is located on the X chromosome and is X-linked; therefore, this disease predominantly affects males, However females may be genetic carriers of certain types of mutations. Other forms of the syndrome involving NEMO-related pathways can be passed on from parent to child in an autosomal dominant manner – this means that a child only has to inherit the faulty gene from one parent to develop the condition. This autosomal dominant type of NEMO deficiency syndrome can affect both boys and girls.

== Presentation ==
=== Commonly associated diseases ===
NEMO deficiency syndrome may present itself as incontinentia pigmenti or ectodermal dysplasia depending on the type of genetic mutation present, such as if the mutation results in the complete loss of gene function or is due to a point mutation that only partially reduces NEMO function.

Amorphic genetic mutations in the IKBKG gene, which result in the loss of gene function, typically present themselves as incontinentia pigmenti (IP). Because loss of NEMO function is lethal, only heterozygous females or males with XXY karyotype or mosaicism for this gene survive and exhibit symptoms of incontinetia pigmenti, such as skin lesions and abnormalities in hair, teeth, and nails. There are a variety of mutations that may cause the symptoms of IP. However, they all involve the deletion of exons on the IKBKG gene.

Hypomorphic genetic mutations in the IKBKG gene, resulting in a partial loss of gene function, cause the onset of anhidrotic ectodermal dysplasia with immunodeficiency (EDA-IP). The lack of NEMO results in a decreased level of NF-κB transcription factor translocation and gene transcription, which in turn leads to a low level of immunoglobulin production. Because NF-κB translocation to the nucleus is unable to occur without proper NEMO function, the cell signaling response to immune mediators such as IL-1β, IL-18, and LPS is ineffective – thus leading to a compromised immune response to various forms of bacterial infections.

== Diagnosis ==
Originally NEMO deficiency syndrome was thought to be a combination of Ectodermal Dysplasia (ED) and a lack of immune function, but is now understood to be a more complex disease. NEMO Deficiency Syndrome may manifest itself in the form of several different diseases dependent upon mutations of the IKBKG gene such as Incontinentia pigmenti or Ectodermal dysplasia.

The clinical presentation of NEMO deficiency is determined by three main symptoms:

1. Susceptibility to pyogenic infections in the form of severe local inflammation
2. Susceptibility to mycobacterial infection
3. Symptoms of Ectodermal Dysplasia

To determine whether or not a patient has NEMO deficiency, an immunologic screen to test their immune system response to antigen may be used; however, a genetic test that looks for mutations in the IKBKG gene is the only way to be certain because many individuals can have other defects that cause them respond differently to the immunological tests.

== Treatment ==
The aim of treatment is to prevent infections, so children will usually be started on immunoglobulin treatment. Immunoglobulin is also known as IgG or antibody. It is a blood product and is given as a replacement for people who are unable to make their own antibodies. It is the mainstay of treatment for patients affected by primary antibody deficiency. In addition to immunoglobulin treatment, children may need to take antibiotics or antifungal medicines to prevent infections or treat them promptly when they occur. Regular monitoring and check-ups will help to catch infections early. If an autoimmune response occurs, this can be treated with steroid and/or biologic medicines to dampen down the immune system and relieve the symptoms.

In some severely affected patients, NEMO deficiency syndrome is treated using a bone marrow or blood stem cell transplant from a compatible donor. The aim is to replace the faulty immune system with an immune system from a healthy donor.
