= TOM1L2 =

Protein-coding gene in the species Homo sapiens

Identifiers
- Aliases: TOM1L2, target of myb1 like 2 membrane trafficking protein
- External IDs: OMIM: 615519; MGI: 2443306; HomoloGene: 44901; GeneCards: TOM1L2; OMA:TOM1L2 - orthologs

Gene location (Human)
Chr.	Chromosome 17 (human)
Band	17p11.2	Start	17,843,511 bp
Band	17p11.2	End	17,972,422 bp

Gene location (Mouse)
Chr.	Chromosome 11 (mouse)
Band	11|11 B2	Start	60,117,540 bp
Band	11|11 B2	End	60,243,731 bp
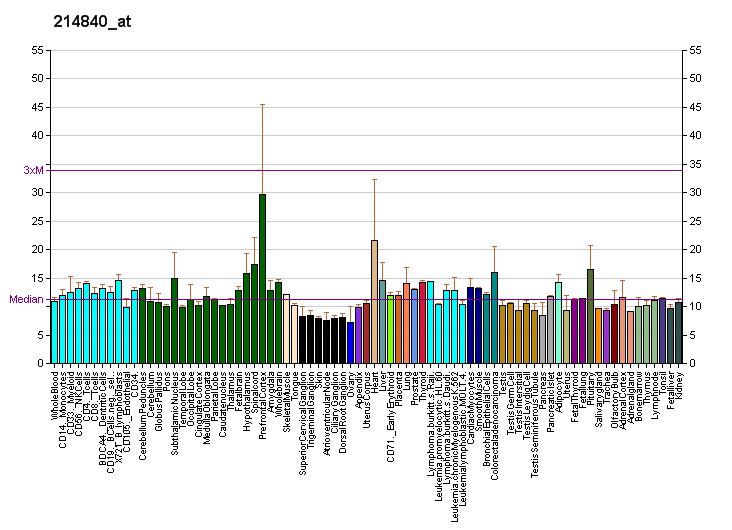
RNA expression pattern
Bgee	Human / Mouse (ortholog); Top expressed in: sural nerve; apex of heart; right auricle of heart; left ventricle; right frontal lobe; right lobe of thyroid gland; lateral nuclear group of thalamus; skin of leg; amygdala; right hemisphere of cerebellum / Top expressed in: habenula; pontine nuclei; superior colliculus; dorsal tegmental nucleus; central gray substance of midbrain; dentate gyrus of hippocampal formation granule cell; subiculum; ventral tegmental area; primary visual cortex; superior frontal gyrus; More reference expression data
BioGPS	More reference expression data
Gene ontology
Molecular function	clathrin binding; protein binding; protein kinase binding
Cellular component	extracellular exosome; intracellular anatomical structure
Biological process	protein transport; intracellular protein transport; negative regulation of mitotic nuclear division; signal transduction; transport
Sources:Amigo / QuickGO
Orthologs
Species	Human	Mouse
Entrez	146691	216810
Ensembl	ENSG00000175662	ENSMUSG00000000538
UniProt	Q6ZVM7	Q5SRX1
RefSeq (mRNA)	NM_001033551; NM_001082968; NM_001288786; NM_001288787; NM_001288788 NM_001288789; NM_144678; NM_001350331; NM_001350332; NM_001350333	NM_001039092; NM_001039093; NM_153080; NM_001359810
RefSeq (protein)	NP_001028723; NP_001076437; NP_001275715; NP_001275716; NP_001275717 NP_001275718; NP_001337260; NP_001337261; NP_001337262	NP_001034181; NP_001034182; NP_694720; NP_001346739; NP_001390817 NP_001390820; NP_001390822; NP_001390824; NP_001390825
Location (UCSC)	Chr 17: 17.84 – 17.97 Mb	Chr 11: 60.12 – 60.24 Mb
PubMed search
- Wikidata
View/Edit Human	View/Edit Mouse

TOM1-like protein 2 is a protein that in humans is encoded by the TOM1L2 gene.

== See also ==
- TOM1, target of Myb1 membrane trafficking protein
- TOM1L1
