= Robert Cooke (physician) =

American immunologist and allergist

Robert Anderson Cooke
- Born: 1880; Holmdel Township, New Jersey, U.S.
- Died: 1960 (aged 79–80)
- Education: Rutgers University; Columbia University College of Physicians and Surgeons
- Known for: Early work on heredity allergy (1916); Development of desensitization / hyposensitization concepts (1918); Co-introducing the term atopy (1923)
- Scientific career
- Fields: Immunology, Allergology

Robert Anderson Cooke (1880–1960), was an American immunologist and allergist.

== Early life and education ==
Cooke was born in 1880 in Holmdel Township, New Jersey, into a family of physicians. After earning bachelor's and master's degrees at Rutgers University, he earned his M.D. from the Columbia University College of Physicians and Surgeons in 1904 and completed his internship at Presbyterian Hospital. His own allergies to stable dusts, pollens, and horses led him to the field of allergy, and during his internship he nearly died from an anaphylactic reaction to a diphtheria antitoxin injection.

== Career ==
In 1916, Cooke and Albert Vandeveer demonstrated the role of heredity in the origins of allergy. According to Cooke, 48% of his allergic patients had allergies in their family history. While the trait of allergy is transmitted through heredity, parents and children may be allergic to different substances.

In 1918, Cooke suggested a mechanism of action for allergen injections as a "desensitization or hyposensitization," analogous to tolerance achieved in experimental anaphylaxis induced in animals. This concept suggested that the injections of an increasing amount of allergen or antigen slowly neutralized those antibodies responsible for the allergic reaction.

In 1923, Cooke and Arthur F. Coca introduced the term atopy to describe the observed association between allergic rhinitis and asthma, a concept that later formed the basis for the term atopic dermatitis introduced by Fred Wise and Marion Sulzberger in 1933.

== Legacy ==
The concept of atopy introduced by Cooke and Arthur F. Coca in 1923 became a cornerstone of modern allergy and dermatology, forming the basis for the later term atopic dermatitis coined in 1933.

== See also ==
- Arthur F. Coca
- Atopy
- Atopic dermatitis
