= Disseminate and recurrent infundibulofolliculitis =

- Other names: Hitch and Lund disease
- Specialty: Dermatology

Disseminate and recurrent infundibulofolliculitis, also called disseminate and recurrent infundibular folliculitis or Hitch and Lund disease, is a rare follicular skin condition that presents with irregularly shaped papules pierced by hair, is mildly itchy at times, and is chronic with recurrent exacerbations.

== Signs and symptoms ==
The majority of patients describe a quick onset of extensive pruritic papular eruption. It has been noted that hot showers aggravate disseminate and recurrent infundibular folliculitis, while cool showers, creams, and swimming can alleviate it. Sometimes a patient will say that several of their peers have experienced the same problem simultaneously. Individuals with widespread and recurring infundibular folliculitis frequently have a familial or personal history of atopy.

== Causes ==
It is unknown what causes disseminate and recurrent infundibular folliculitis. A hot, muggy atmosphere is frequently mentioned in the history as a precipitating factor. Once it has started, widespread and recurrent infundibular folliculitis usually lasts for a long time before ceasing to exist.

== Diagnosis ==
A non-specific histologic examination reveals superficial spongiotic dermatitis connected to a hair follicle and the surrounding epidermis. A mention of exocytosis is made in the spongiotic region. Inflammatory cells are present in the subadjacent dermis, while the deeper dermis is unaffected.

== Treatment ==
Reducing activity in hot, humid environments may be required to stop or lessen the symptoms of disseminate and recurrent infundibular folliculitis. For thirty years, cooling, soothing emollients have been used to treat disseminate and recurrent infundibular folliculitis, with varying degrees of efficacy.

== See also ==
- Skin lesion
