= IRAK1 =

Protein-coding gene in humans

Identifiers
- Aliases: IRAK1, IRAK, pelle, interleukin 1 receptor associated kinase 1
- External IDs: OMIM: 300283; MGI: 107420; GeneCards: IRAK1
Enzyme activity
EC #	BRENDA	ExPASy	KEGG	MetaCyc
2.7.11.1	↗	↗	↗	↗

Gene location (Human)
Chr.	X chromosome (human)
Band	Xq28	Start	154,010,506 bp
Band	Xq28	End	154,019,902 bp

Gene location (Mouse)
Chr.	X chromosome (mouse)
Band	X A7.3|X 37.61 cM	Start	73,057,520 bp
Band	X A7.3|X 37.61 cM	End	73,067,524 bp
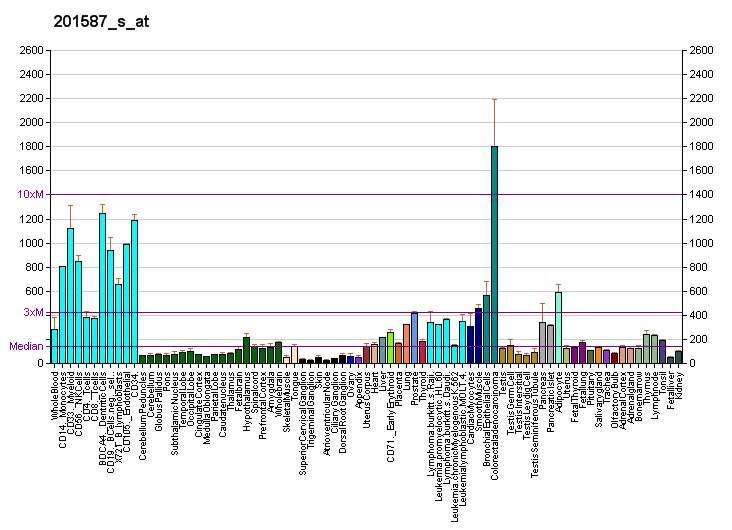
RNA expression pattern
Bgee	Human / Mouse (ortholog); Top expressed in: parotid gland; pancreatic ductal cell; endothelial cell; gingival epithelium; periodontal fiber; duodenum; epithelium of esophagus; mucosa of ileum; stromal cell of endometrium; granulocyte / Top expressed in: lacrimal gland; parotid gland; submandibular gland; lobe of prostate; Paneth cell; islet of Langerhans; seminal vesicula; tunica media of zone of aorta; tunica adventitia of aorta; body of femur; More reference expression data
BioGPS	More reference expression data
Gene ontology
Molecular function	transferase activity; protein kinase activity; nucleotide binding; heat shock protein binding; protein homodimerization activity; kinase activity; NF-kappaB-inducing kinase activity; protein binding; protein heterodimerization activity; ATP binding; protein serine/threonine kinase activity
Cellular component	membrane; lipid droplet; plasma membrane; endosome membrane; interleukin-1 receptor complex; nucleus; cytoplasm; cytosol
Biological process	cellular response to heat; response to interleukin-1; positive regulation of MAP kinase activity; regulation of cytokine-mediated signaling pathway; phosphorylation; cytokine-mediated signaling pathway; immune system process; ageing; negative regulation of apoptotic process; activation of NF-kappaB-inducing kinase activity; MyD88-dependent toll-like receptor signaling pathway; toll-like receptor signaling pathway; positive regulation of transcription, DNA-templated; protein phosphorylation; JNK cascade; response to lipopolysaccharide; transmembrane receptor protein serine/threonine kinase signaling pathway; positive regulation of NF-kappaB transcription factor activity; protein complex oligomerization; positive regulation of I-kappaB kinase/NF-kappaB signaling; protein autophosphorylation; toll-like receptor 9 signaling pathway; cellular response to lipopolysaccharide; negative regulation of NF-kappaB transcription factor activity; nucleotide-binding oligomerization domain containing signaling pathway; positive regulation of type I interferon production; cellular response to hypoxia; lipopolysaccharide-mediated signaling pathway; signal transduction; positive regulation of smooth muscle cell proliferation; toll-like receptor 4 signaling pathway; toll-like receptor 2 signaling pathway; innate immune response; type I interferon signaling pathway; viral process; interleukin-1-mediated signaling pathway; intracellular signal transduction; positive regulation of NIK/NF-kappaB signaling; positive regulation of leukocyte adhesion to vascular endothelial cell
Sources:Amigo / QuickGO
Orthologs
Databases	NCBI: entry; OMA: entry
Species	Human	Mouse
Entrez	3654	16179
Ensembl	ENSG00000184216	ENSMUSG00000031392
UniProt	P51617	Q62406
RefSeq (mRNA)	NM_001025242; NM_001025243; NM_001569	NM_001177973; NM_001177974; NM_001177975; NM_001177976; NM_008363
RefSeq (protein)	NP_001020413; NP_001020414; NP_001560	NP_001171444; NP_001171445; NP_001171446; NP_001171447; NP_032389
Location (UCSC)	Chr X: 154.01 – 154.02 Mb	Chr X: 73.06 – 73.07 Mb
PubMed search
- Wikidata
View/Edit Human	View/Edit Mouse

Interleukin-1 receptor-associated kinase 1 (IRAK-1) is an enzyme in humans encoded by the IRAK1 gene. IRAK-1 plays an important role in the regulation of the expression of inflammatory genes by immune cells, such as monocytes and macrophages, which in turn help the immune system in eliminating bacteria, viruses, and other pathogens. IRAK-1 is part of the IRAK family consisting of IRAK-1, IRAK-2, IRAK-3, and IRAK-4, and is activated by inflammatory molecules released by signaling pathways during pathogenic attack. IRAK-1 is classified as a kinase enzyme, which regulates pathways in both innate and adaptive immune systems.

== Structure ==
IRAK-1 contains an N-terminal death domain (DD), a ProST domain, a centrally located kinase domain, and a C-terminal domain. The DD on IRAK-1 acts as an interaction platform for other DD-containing protein, most notably the adaptor protein myeloid differentiation factor 88, MyD88.

The proST domain contains serine, proline, and threonine amino acid residues and is used to facilitate IRAK-1 interaction with other IRAK family members or proteins. For example, auto-phosphorylation may occur multiple times in the ProST domain, which allows IRAK-1 to dissociate from the MyD88 bound to the DD while maintaining interactions with downstream proteins such as TNF receptor-associated factor 6 (TRAF-6) to initiate further pathway signaling.

Moreover, IRAK-1 contains an invariant lysine within the centrally located kinase domain. The invariant lysine acts as a binding site for ATP and a mediator for catalytic function and kinase activity.

IRAK-1 also contains a tyrosine residue (Tyr^{262}) that conformationally changes the active site of the IRAK-1 by inhibiting the hydrophilic pocket behind the binding site and thereby allows the IRAK-1 to remain in an active state. For example, ATP binding to the IRAK-1 binding site can readily occur in the presence of Tyr^{266}, because Tyr^{266} will occupy the hydrophilic pocket where ATP competitive inhibitors may bind and disrupt catalytic function.

== Activation ==
In the presence of foreign pathogens, IRAK-1 induced signaling pathways can be activated by Toll-like receptors (TLRs) or by interleukin-1 family receptors (IL-1R) in response. TLRs recognize pathogen-associated molecular patterns (PAMPs) expressed on bacteria and IL-1Rs recognize and bind pro-inflammatory cytokines of the IL-1 family. Both the TLR and IL-1R mediate a signaling cascade that involves MyD88 binding to the receptor, oligomerization of the MyD88, recruitment of IRAK-1 via the DD, multimerization of IRAK-1, and ultimately kinase activation and further downstream signaling.

IRAK-1 can also be activated upon interaction with other IRAK family members. IRAK-1 and IRAK-4 can activate each other by using the DD as a platform for MyD88. IRAK-4 first phosphorylates IRAK-1 which catalyzes an IRAK-1 auto-phosphorylation cascade, occurring in three steps. IRAK-1 is first phosphorylated at Thr209, causing a conformational change. Then, IRAK-1 is phosphorylated at Thr387 rendering IRAK-1 fully active. Finally, auto-phosphorylation at several residues in the proST region stimulates IRAK-1 release from the receptor complex.

== Function ==
The IRAK-1 encodes the interleukin-1 receptor-associated kinase 1, which is a serine-threonine protein kinase that is associated with the interleukin-1 receptor (IL1R) upon stimulation. IRAK-1 is required for pro-inflammatory cytokine production downstream of TLR and IL-1R signaling pathways. Moreover, IRAK-1 is responsible for IL1-induced up-regulation of the transcriptional factor NF-kappa B. Upon binding with its receptor, IRAK-1 becomes activated, as described in Activation, and then dissociates from its receptor complex. IRAK-1 dissociates from the receptor alongside of TRAF6 - a ubiquitin E3 ligase that intermediates between various types of receptors for exogenous or endogenous mediators and activation of transcriptional responses via NF-kappa B and MAPK pathways. IRAK-1 and TRAF-6 then bind to TAK-1 binding protein-1 (TAB-1), followed by binding to transforming growth factor-β-activated kinase (TAK-1) and TAB-2, forming a new complex. This complex then translocates into the cytoplasm wherein it associates with ubiquitin ligases such as ubiquitin conjugating enzyme-13 UBC-13 and ubiquitin conjugating enzyme E2 variant-1(UEV-1a), leading to the ubiquitination and degradation of TRAF-6. TAK-1 is then activated and phosphorylation of the inhibitor of κB kinase (IKK) complex, consisting of IKKα, IKKβ, and IKKγ, occurs. MAPKs are also activated in the process. Finally, NF-κB is activated to regulate the transcription of pro-inflammatory genes. Alternatively, IRAK-1 activation of the NF-κB pathway can be regulated by the ubiquitination of Lys^{134} and Lys^{180}.

Alternatively spliced transcript variants encoding different isoforms have been found for the IRAK1 gene. Currently, there are three differentially spliced variants of IRAK1 - IRAK1, IRAK1b, and IRAK1c. IRAK1 was observed to undergo sumoylation, promoting its translocation to the nucleus instead of the cytoplasm upon pathogenic attack. IRAK1c, notably, remains stable upon sumoylation, does not undergo modification under the same circumstances and localizes only to the cytoplasm.

IRAK-1 kinase activity is not the sole protein involved in pro-inflammatory immune responses, however, it serves as an adaptor protein that effectively binds MyD88, IRAK-4, the toll-interacting proteins (TOLLIP) together to form a complex that induces IL-1R-mediated NF-κB activation.

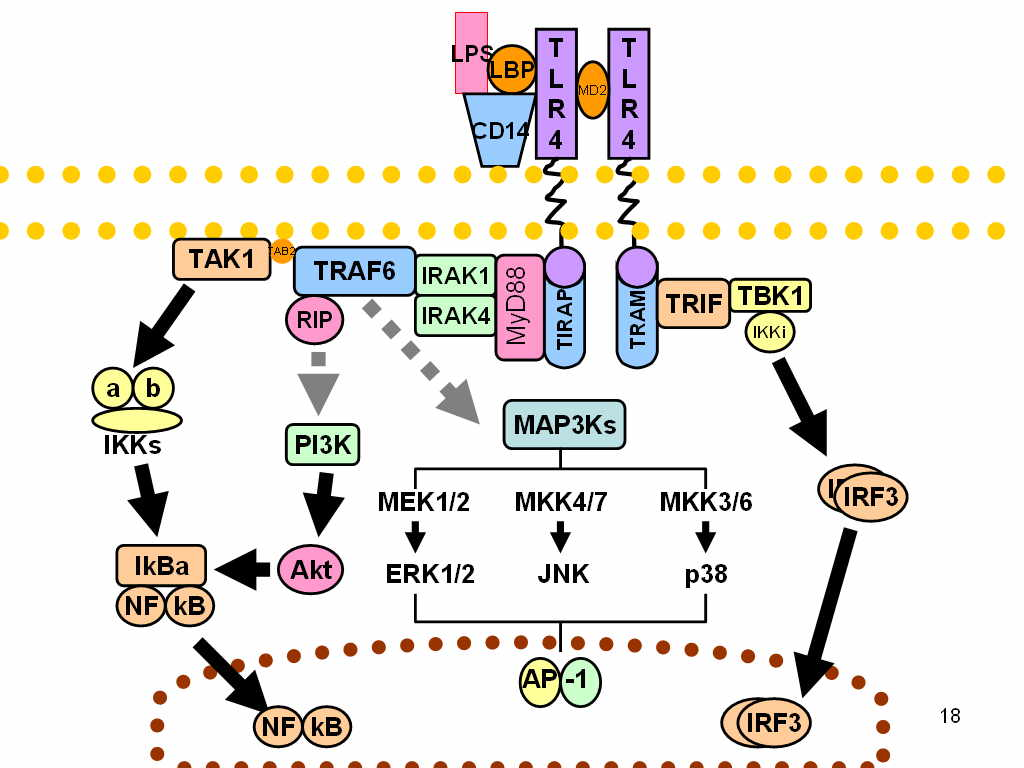
Signaling pathway of toll-like receptors. Dashed grey lines represent unknown associations

== Regulation ==
IRAK-1 activity is regulated during its activation and function. Auto-phosphorylation plays a role in IRAK-1 activation (see Activation), and also mediates proteasome-mediated degradation which results in the loss of the IRAK1 protein. Alternatively, IRAK-1 may be regulated on the transcriptional level. The IRAK-1b splice variant lacks kinase activity and is resistant to proteasome-mediated degradation. Moreover, IRAK-1c splice variant has a truncated and thus mutated sequence at the C-terminus of its kinase domain and acts a negative regulator of the TLR and IL-1R signaling pathways.

== Interactions ==
IRAK1 has been shown to interact with the following proteins:

- CHUK
- IKBKG
- IKK2,
- Myd88
- NEMO
- SOCS1
- STAT3
- TRAF6
- UBC,
- TOLLIP
- TLR4

== Clinical significance ==
IRAK-1 signaling is involved in rheumatoid arthritis. Moreover, IRAK-1 plays a significant role in cancer.
