= Allergic march =

Medical term used to explain the natural history of atopic manifestations

The allergic march (also called atopic march) is a medical term used to explain the natural history of atopic manifestations. The allergic march is characterized by some antibody responses to immunoglobulin E (IgE) and clinical symptoms that may appear in childhood, and continue for years or decades and often changing with age. The atopic march is a term that describes the progression of atopic disorders, from eczema in young infants and toddlers to allergic rhinitis and finally to asthma in adulthood. Symptoms include atopic dermatitis, food allergy, allergic rhinitis and asthma.

== Relationship between the components of the atopic march ==
=== Atopic dermatitis - IgE-mediated food allergy ===
Children with atopic dermatitis are as much as six times more likely to develop a food allergy compared to their healthy peers. In regard to food allergens, sensitization rates in patients with atopic dermatitis vary from 30 to 80%, but the clinically relevant food allergy proportions may be lower especially in less-severe phenotypes of atopic dermatitis.

=== Atopic dermatitis - asthma ===
The relationship between atopic dermatitis and respiratory allergy is influenced by atopic dermatitis severity—while around 20% of children with mild atopic dermatitis develop asthma, over 60% with severe atopic dermatitis develop asthma. Not every patient with atopic dermatitis develops asthma, and not every patient with asthma has preceding atopic dermatitis.

=== Food allergy - asthma and allergic rhinitis ===
Food allergy may precede the development of respiratory allergic diseases such as asthma. Having a food allergy increases the risk of developing asthma by about 2 times and allergic rhinitis by about 3 times.

=== Asthma - allergic rhinitis ===
Clinical relationship between asthma and allergic rhinitis is well established, with up to three quarters of asthmatics reporting rhinitis symptoms. Allergic rhinitis is also positively correlated with asthma severity, and allergic rhinitis treatment improves asthma control.

== See also ==
- Atopy
