= TOM1L1 =

Protein-coding gene in the species Homo sapiens

Available structures
PDB	Ortholog search: PDBe RCSB
PDB	List of PDB id codes 3RRU

Identifiers
- Aliases: TOM1L1, OK/KNS-CL.3, SRCASM, target of myb1 like 1 membrane trafficking protein
- External IDs: OMIM: 604701; MGI: 1919193; HomoloGene: 38055; GeneCards: TOM1L1; OMA:TOM1L1 - orthologs

Gene location (Human)
Chr.	Chromosome 17 (human)
Band	17q22	Start	54,899,387 bp
Band	17q22	End	54,961,956 bp

Gene location (Mouse)
Chr.	Chromosome 11 (mouse)
Band	11 D|11 55.47 cM	Start	90,534,291 bp
Band	11 D|11 55.47 cM	End	90,579,192 bp
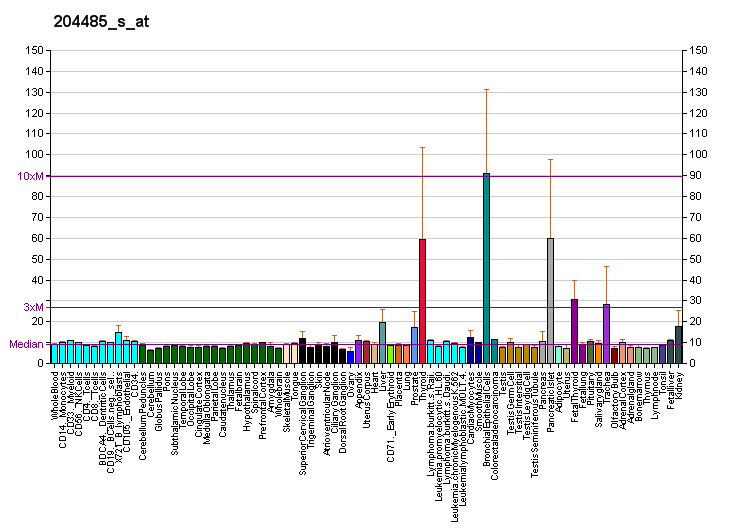
RNA expression pattern
Bgee	Human / Mouse (ortholog); Top expressed in: jejunal mucosa; duodenum; islet of Langerhans; body of pancreas; rectum; kidney tubule; right lobe of liver; corpus epididymis; body of stomach; human kidney / Top expressed in: seminal vesicula; white matter of spinal cord; yolk sac; lens; tail of embryo; zygote; genital tubercle; duodenum; stomach; choroid plexus of fourth ventricle; More reference expression data
BioGPS	More reference expression data
Gene ontology
Molecular function	SH3 domain binding; clathrin binding; protein kinase activator activity; ubiquitin binding; protein binding; protein kinase binding
Cellular component	cytoplasm; cytosol; endosome; Golgi apparatus; membrane; intracellular anatomical structure; Golgi stack; lysosome; endosome membrane; extracellular exosome
Biological process	regulation of DNA biosynthetic process; negative regulation of mitotic nuclear division; positive regulation of protein autophosphorylation; protein transport; ubiquitin-dependent protein catabolic process via the multivesicular body sorting pathway; intracellular protein transport; activation of protein kinase activity; signal transduction; transport
Sources:Amigo / QuickGO
Orthologs
Species	Human	Mouse
Entrez	10040	71943
Ensembl	ENSG00000141198	ENSMUSG00000020541
UniProt	O75674	Q923U0
RefSeq (mRNA)	NM_005486; NM_001321173; NM_001321174; NM_001321175; NM_001321176	NM_028011; NM_001357543; NM_001357544; NM_001357547
RefSeq (protein)	NP_001308102; NP_001308103; NP_001308104; NP_001308105; NP_005477	NP_082287; NP_001344472; NP_001344473; NP_001344476
Location (UCSC)	Chr 17: 54.9 – 54.96 Mb	Chr 11: 90.53 – 90.58 Mb
PubMed search
- Wikidata
View/Edit Human	View/Edit Mouse

TOM1-like protein 1 is a protein that in humans is encoded by the TOM1L1 gene.

== See also ==
- TOM1, target of Myb1 membrane trafficking protein
