= MAP3K14 =

Protein-coding gene in the species Homo sapiens

Identifiers
- Aliases: MAP3K14, FTDCR1B, HS, HSNIK, NIK, mitogen-activated protein kinase kinase kinase 14
- External IDs: OMIM: 604655; MGI: 1858204; GeneCards: MAP3K14
Available structures
PDB	Ortholog search: PDBe RCSB
PDB	List of PDB id codes 4DN5, 4G3D, 4IDT, 4IDV
Enzyme activity
EC #	BRENDA	ExPASy	KEGG	MetaCyc
2.7.11.25	↗	↗	↗	↗

Gene location (Human)
Chr.	Chromosome 17 (human)
Band	17q21.31	Start	45,263,119 bp
Band	17q21.31	End	45,317,029 bp

Gene location (Mouse)
Chr.	Chromosome 11 (mouse)
Band	11 E1|11 66.8 cM	Start	103,110,588 bp
Band	11 E1|11 66.8 cM	End	103,158,298 bp
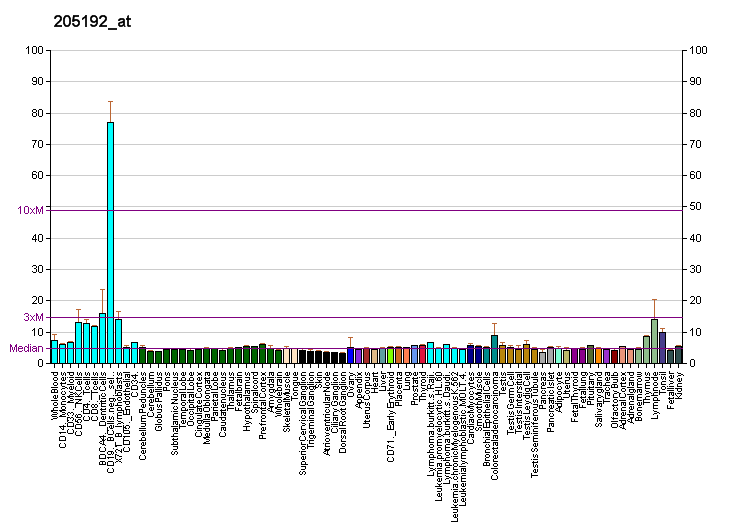
RNA expression pattern
Bgee	Human / Mouse (ortholog); Top expressed in: granulocyte; gastrocnemius muscle; muscle layer of sigmoid colon; apex of heart; gastric mucosa; lymph node; tibialis anterior muscle; spleen; right auricle of heart; anterior pituitary / Top expressed in: granulocyte; lumbar spinal ganglion; gastrula; submandibular gland; blood; mesenteric lymph nodes; muscle of thigh; thymus; spleen; lip; More reference expression data
BioGPS	More reference expression data
Gene ontology
Molecular function	transferase activity; protein kinase activity; nucleotide binding; NF-kappaB-inducing kinase activity; protein binding; MAP kinase kinase kinase activity; ATP binding; kinase activity; protein serine/threonine kinase activity
Cellular component	cytoplasm; fibrillar center; nucleus; cytosol; intracellular membrane-bounded organelle
Biological process	phosphorylation; tumor necrosis factor-mediated signaling pathway; MAPK cascade; protein phosphorylation; cellular response to mechanical stimulus; immune response; positive regulation of I-kappaB kinase/NF-kappaB signaling; I-kappaB kinase/NF-kappaB signaling; NIK/NF-kappaB signaling; regulation of mitotic cell cycle; signal transduction; stress-activated protein kinase signaling cascade; activation of protein kinase activity; regulation of apoptotic process
Sources:Amigo / QuickGO
Orthologs
Databases	NCBI: entry; OMA: entry
Species	Human	Mouse
Entrez	9020	53859
Ensembl	ENSG00000006062; ENSG00000282637	ENSMUSG00000020941
UniProt	Q99558	Q9WUL6
RefSeq (mRNA)	NM_003954	NM_016896
RefSeq (protein)	NP_003945	NP_058592
Location (UCSC)	Chr 17: 45.26 – 45.32 Mb	Chr 11: 103.11 – 103.16 Mb
PubMed search
- Wikidata
View/Edit Human	View/Edit Mouse

Mitogen-activated protein kinase kinase kinase 14 (MAP3K14), also known as NF-kappa-B-inducing kinase (NIK), is a MAP kinase kinase kinase enzyme that in humans is encoded by the MAP3K14 gene.

== Function ==
This gene encodes mitogen-activated protein kinase kinase kinase 14, NIK, which is a serine/threonine protein-kinase. This kinase binds to TRAF2 and stimulates NF-κB activity. It is a critical kinase of the alternative NF-κB activation pathway. It shares sequence similarity with several other MAPKK kinases. It participates in an NF-κB-inducing signalling cascade common to receptors of the tumour-necrosis/nerve-growth factor (TNF/NGF) family and to the interleukin-1 type-I receptor.

== Interactions ==
MAP3K14 has been shown to interact with:

- CHUK,
- IKK2, and
- TRAF2.
