= PPM1B =

Protein-coding gene in the species Homo sapiens

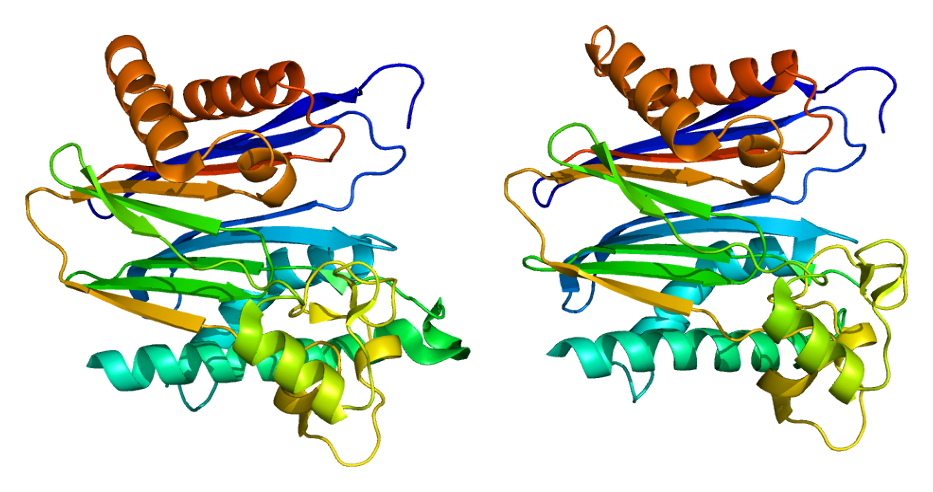

Identifiers
- Aliases: PPM1B, PP2C-beta, PP2C-beta-X, PP2CB, PP2CBETA, PPC2BETAX, protein phosphatase, Mg2+/Mn2+ dependent 1B
- External IDs: OMIM: 603770; MGI: 101841; GeneCards: PPM1B
Available structures
PDB	Ortholog search: PDBe RCSB
PDB	List of PDB id codes 2P8E
Enzyme activity
EC #	BRENDA	ExPASy	KEGG	MetaCyc
3.1.3.16	↗	↗	↗	↗

Gene location (Human)
Chr.	Chromosome 2 (human)
Band	2p21	Start	44,167,969 bp
Band	2p21	End	44,244,384 bp

Gene location (Mouse)
Chr.	Chromosome 17 (mouse)
Band	17 E4|17 55.13 cM	Start	85,264,169 bp
Band	17 E4|17 55.13 cM	End	85,331,419 bp
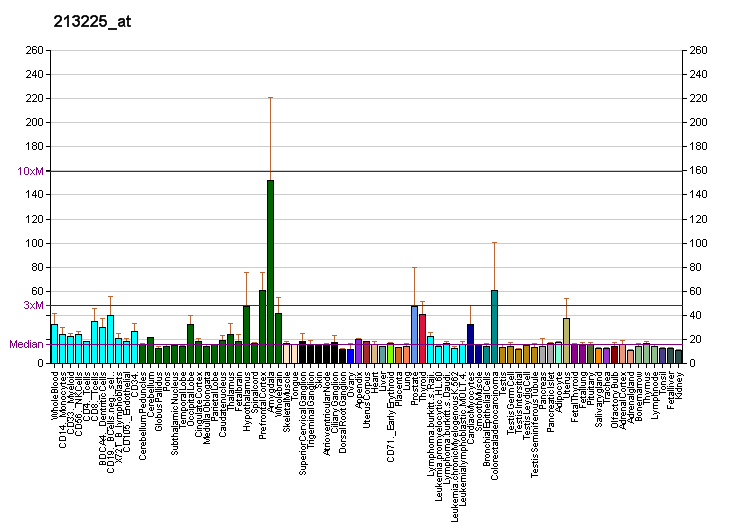
RNA expression pattern
Bgee	Human / Mouse (ortholog); Top expressed in: secondary oocyte; Epithelium of choroid plexus; retinal pigment epithelium; gastrocnemius muscle; biceps brachii; Skeletal muscle tissue of rectus abdominis; muscle of thigh; Skeletal muscle tissue of biceps brachii; deltoid muscle; glutes / Top expressed in: neural layer of retina; ankle; spermatid; muscle of thigh; digastric muscle; temporal muscle; saccule; sternocleidomastoid muscle; body of femur; cerebellar cortex; More reference expression data
BioGPS	More reference expression data
Gene ontology
Molecular function	protein binding; magnesium ion binding; manganese ion binding; protein serine/threonine phosphatase activity; phosphoprotein phosphatase activity; catalytic activity; cation binding; hydrolase activity; metal ion binding
Cellular component	membrane; cytoplasm; nucleolus; cytosol; nucleus
Biological process	protein dephosphorylation; negative regulation of I-kappaB kinase/NF-kappaB signaling; negative regulation of defense response to virus; N-terminal protein myristoylation; peptidyl-threonine dephosphorylation; negative regulation of interferon-beta production; negative regulation of NIK/NF-kappaB signaling
Sources:Amigo / QuickGO
Orthologs
Databases	NCBI: entry; OMA: entry
Species	Human	Mouse
Entrez	5495	19043
Ensembl	ENSG00000138032	ENSMUSG00000061130
UniProt	O75688	P36993
RefSeq (mRNA)	NM_001033556; NM_001033557; NM_002706; NM_177968; NM_177969	NM_001159496; NM_001159497; NM_001159498; NM_011151
RefSeq (protein)	NP_001028729; NP_002697; NP_808907; NP_808908	NP_001152968; NP_001152969; NP_001152970; NP_035281
Location (UCSC)	Chr 2: 44.17 – 44.24 Mb	Chr 17: 85.26 – 85.33 Mb
PubMed search
- Wikidata
View/Edit Human	View/Edit Mouse

Protein phosphatase 1B is an enzyme that in humans is encoded by the PPM1B gene.

== Function ==
The protein encoded by this gene is a member of the PP2C family of Ser/Thr protein phosphatases. PP2C family members are known to be negative regulators of cell stress response pathways. This phosphatase has been shown to dephosphorylate cyclin-dependent kinases (CDKs), and thus may be involved in cell cycle control. Overexpression of this phosphatase is reported to cause cell-growth arrest or cell death. Alternative splicing results in multiple transcript variants encoding different isoforms. Additional transcript variants have been described, but currently do not represent full-length sequences.

== Interactions ==
PPM1B has been shown to interact with:

- CDK2,
- CDK6,
- CHUK,
- IKBKG,
- IKK2,
- MAP3K7, and
- PPARγ.
