= Arthur F. Coca =

American immunologist

- Born: 20 March 1875; Philadelphia
- Died: 11 December 1959 (aged 84)
- Occupation: Immunologist

Arthur Fernandez Coca (20 March 1875 – 11 December 1959) was an American immunologist known for his research on allergies.

== Biography ==
Coca was born in Philadelphia. He was educated at Haverford College and obtained his M.D. from University of Pennsylvania in 1900. He studied at Heidelberg University and during 1907–1909 was an assistant to Emil von Dungern at the Cancer Institute of Heidelberg's chemical laboratory. He worked as a bacteriologist at the Bureau of Science in Manila and was instructor in Pathology and Bacteriology at Cornell University Medical College during 1910–1919. He was Professor of Immunology and Professor of Medicine at the New York Postgraduate Medical School, Columbia University from 1924 to 1935. He was also medical director of Lederle Laboratories until 1949.

Coca specialized in studying allergies. He has been described as one of the pioneers of allergology. In 1953, he authored the book Familial Nonreaginic Food-Allergy. Coca and Robert Cooke coined the term atopy in 1923 when recognizing an association between allergic rhinitis and asthma. Science historian Arthur M. Silverstein has noted that Coca contributed "significantly to the development of allergy as a scientific discipline". Coca attempted to classify hypersensitive states to conditions such as dermatosis, hay fever and serum sickness. Coca and Robert Cooke founded the Society of Asthma and Allied Conditions in 1924. Coca also founded the Allergy Roundtable Discussion Group in New York.

Coca founded The Journal of Immunology and was its editor from 1916 to 1948. He was Honorary President of the American Association of Immunologists, a position he held from 1949 until his death.

== Pulse test ==
Coca developed a new method to diagnose allergies by testing his patients pulse rate, known as the "pulse test". He wrote about it in his book The Pulse Test: Easy Allergy Detection, first published in 1956. Coca argued that hidden food allergies are the cause of almost every disease and disorder including heart attacks, asthma, constipation, diabetes, epilepsy, hypertension, indigestion, migraine and many others. He stated that the pulse test could help his patients identify which foods they were allergic to. For example, if the pulse rises after eating a certain food, then this means the patient is allergic to that food. Coca did not offer any scientific evidence for his pulse test and it was dismissed by the scientific community but later promoted by alternative medicine websites. Harriet Hall has commented that Coca "never put his beliefs to any kind of a valid scientific test... Many factors affect the pulse rate, and when patients are aware that a food is being tested, anxiety, excitement, and other factors could affect the pulse rate. There are just too many variables for the pulse test to be a reliable indicator of anything."

== Selected publications ==
- Familial Nonreaginic Food-Allergy (1953)
- The Pulse Test: Easy Allergy Detection (1956, 1959)
- The Pulse Test: The Secret of Building Your Basic Health (1995)
