= Acheiria =

Acheiria /əˈkɪəriə/ is the congenital absence of one or both hands.

== Causes ==
It can occur in a number of situations which include:

- Amniotic band syndrome, particularly if unilateral
- Cornelia de Lange syndrome
- Fetal hydantoin syndrome
- Incontinentia pigmenti
