= TRAF3IP2 =

Protein-coding gene in the species Homo sapiens

Identifiers
- Aliases: TRAF3IP2, ACT1, C6orf2, C6orf4, C6orf5, C6orf6, CANDF8, CIKS, PSORS13, TRAF3 interacting protein 2
- External IDs: OMIM: 607043; MGI: 2143599; HomoloGene: 15885; GeneCards: TRAF3IP2; OMA:TRAF3IP2 - orthologs

Gene location (Human)
Chr.	Chromosome 6 (human)
Band	6q21	Start	111,555,381 bp
Band	6q21	End	111,606,906 bp

Gene location (Mouse)
Chr.	Chromosome 10 (mouse)
Band	10|10 B1	Start	39,488,930 bp
Band	10|10 B1	End	39,531,303 bp
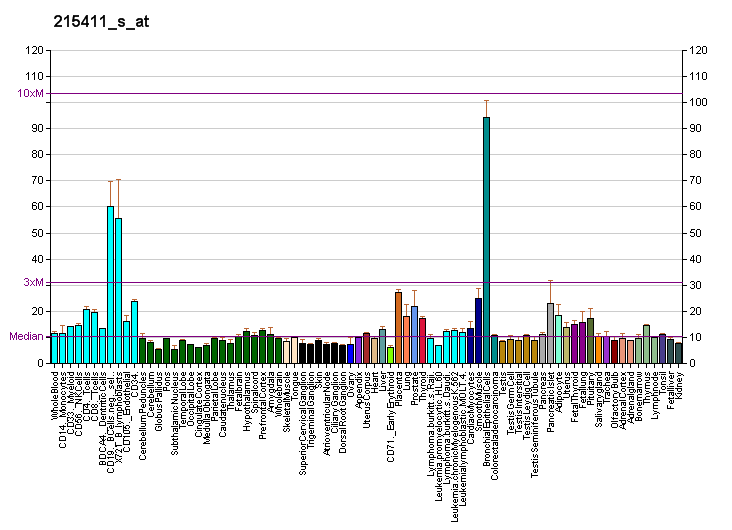

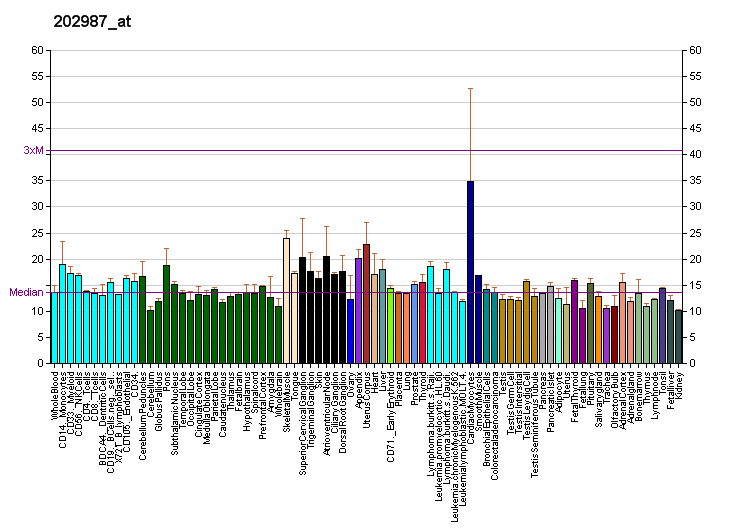
RNA expression pattern
Bgee	Human / Mouse (ortholog); Top expressed in: cartilage tissue; oocyte; skin of leg; skin of abdomen; body of uterus; mucosa of transverse colon; epithelium of colon; islet of Langerhans; ectocervix; olfactory zone of nasal mucosa / Top expressed in: lacrimal gland; parotid gland; lip; genital tubercle; neural layer of retina; seminal vesicula; Paneth cell; duodenum; uterus; large intestine; More reference expression data
BioGPS	More reference expression data
Gene ontology
Molecular function	signaling receptor binding; protein binding
Cellular component	intracellular anatomical structure; cellular component
Biological process	positive regulation of I-kappaB kinase/NF-kappaB signaling; intracellular signal transduction; humoral immune response; B cell apoptotic process; positive regulation of defense response to virus by host
Sources:Amigo / QuickGO
Orthologs
Species	Human	Mouse
Entrez	10758	103213
Ensembl	ENSG00000056972	ENSMUSG00000019842
UniProt	O43734	Q8N7N6
RefSeq (mRNA)	NM_001164281; NM_001164282; NM_001164283; NM_147200; NM_147686	NM_134000
RefSeq (protein)	NP_001157753; NP_001157755; NP_671733; NP_679211	NP_598761
Location (UCSC)	Chr 6: 111.56 – 111.61 Mb	Chr 10: 39.49 – 39.53 Mb
PubMed search
- Wikidata
View/Edit Human	View/Edit Mouse

Adapter protein CIKS is a protein that in humans is encoded by the TRAF3IP2 gene.

This gene encodes a protein involved in regulating responses to cytokines by members of the Rel/NF-kappaB transcription factor family. These factors play a central role in innate immunity in response to pathogens, inflammatory signals and stress. This gene product interacts with TRAF proteins (tumor necrosis factor receptor-associated factors) and either I-kappaB kinase or MAP kinase to activate either NF-kappaB or Jun kinase. Two alternative transcripts encoding different proteins have been identified. A third transcript, which does not encode a protein and is transcribed in the opposite orientation, has been identified. Overexpression of this transcript has been shown to reduce expression of at least one of the protein encoding transcripts, suggesting it has a regulatory role in the expression of this gene.

== Cellular function ==
TRAF3IP2 is the key activator of Th17-mediated inflammatory responses but also suppresses the humoral B cell response by negatively regulating CD40L and BAFF signaling. TRAF3IP2 seems to be more specific to Brucella infections than other Gram-negative bacteria. In the study of Degos et al., TRAF3IP2 expression was increased fourfold in human blood DCs after exposure to the Brucella virulence factor CβG (β-1,2 cyclic glucan) compared to the E. coli lipopolysaccharides (LPS) CβG is a highly abundant virulence factor of Brucella that modulates membrane rafts of the infected cell necessary for the intracellular escape (Arellano-Reynoso et al., 2005). It is thus one of the most Brucella-specific toxins recognized by immune cells. LPS is another important Gram-negative virulence factor. However, it is altered in Brucella, so it is only weakly immunostimulatory. Also, TRAF3IP2 and Th2-LCR lncRNA expression was particularly increased in the acute phase of brucellosis. During relapse phase of brucellosis, TRAF3IP2 expression seemed to decrease, whereas the Th2-LCR lncRNA level remained high.

== Interactions ==
TRAF3IP2 has been shown to interact with IKBKG.
