= G3BP2 =

Protein-coding gene in the species Homo sapiens

Identifiers
- Aliases: G3BP2, G3BP stress granule assembly factor 2
- External IDs: MGI: 2442040; GeneCards: G3BP2
Available structures
PDB	Ortholog search: PDBe RCSB
PDB	List of PDB id codes 5DRV

Gene location (Human)
Chr.	Chromosome 4 (human)
Band	4q21.1	Start	75,641,849 bp
Band	4q21.1	End	75,724,589 bp

Gene location (Mouse)
Chr.	Chromosome 5 (mouse)
Band	5|5 E2	Start	92,200,005 bp
Band	5|5 E2	End	92,231,578 bp
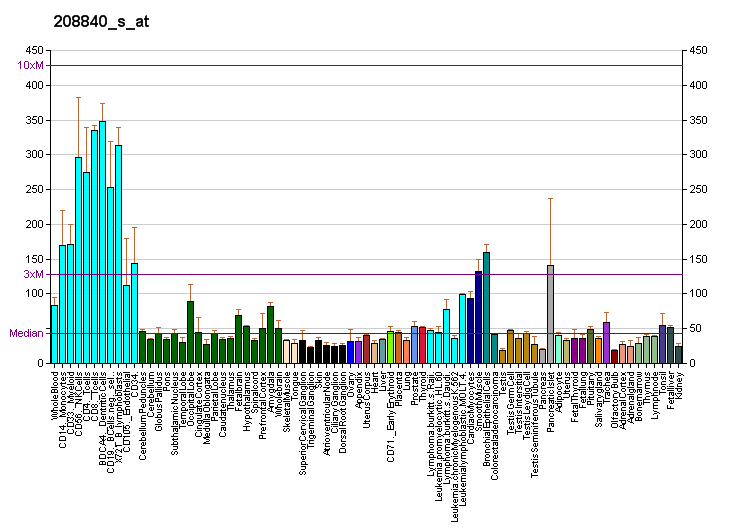

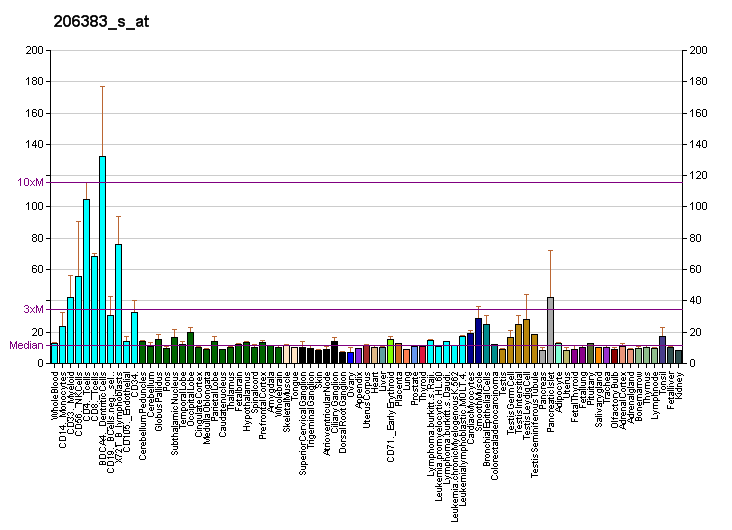

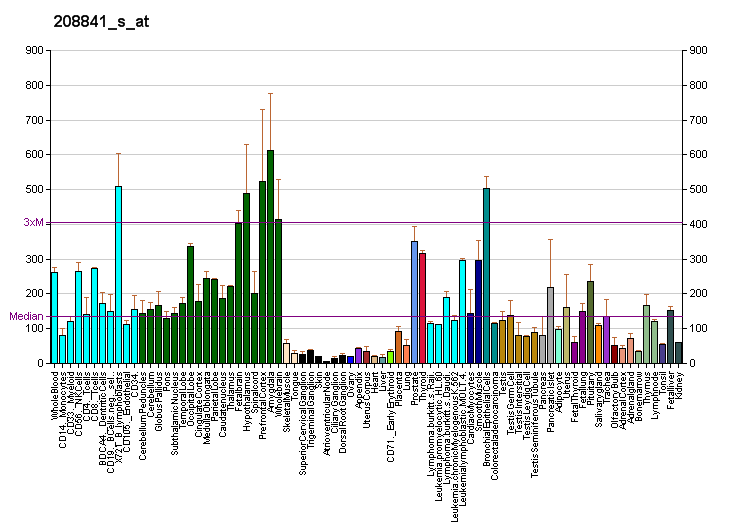
RNA expression pattern
Bgee	Human / Mouse (ortholog); Top expressed in: internal globus pallidus; islet of Langerhans; Achilles tendon; frontal pole; pons; pars compacta; lateral nuclear group of thalamus; Skeletal muscle tissue of rectus abdominis; germinal epithelium; epithelium of colon / Top expressed in: zygote; secondary oocyte; tail of embryo; blood; anterior horn of spinal cord; genital tubercle; nucleus accumbens; primary oocyte; abdominal wall; facial motor nucleus; More reference expression data
BioGPS	More reference expression data
Gene ontology
Molecular function	signaling receptor complex adaptor activity; protein binding; nucleic acid binding; mRNA binding; RNA binding
Cellular component	intracellular anatomical structure; cytoplasm; cytosol; ribonucleoprotein complex; cytoplasmic stress granule
Biological process	mRNA transport; Ras protein signal transduction; cytoplasmic sequestering of NF-kappaB; stress granule assembly; transport; positive regulation of signal transduction; viral process; protein homooligomerization; positive regulation of stress granule assembly; immune system process; innate immune response
Sources:Amigo / QuickGO
Orthologs
Databases	NCBI: entry; OMA: entry
Species	Human	Mouse
Entrez	9908	23881
Ensembl	ENSG00000138757	ENSMUSG00000029405
UniProt	Q9UN86	P97379
RefSeq (mRNA)	NM_012297; NM_203504; NM_203505	NM_001080794; NM_001080795; NM_001080796; NM_001080797; NM_011816 NM_001359195; NM_001359196; NM_001359197
RefSeq (protein)	NP_036429; NP_987100; NP_987101; NP_987100.1	NP_001074263; NP_001074264; NP_001074265; NP_001074266; NP_035946 NP_001346124; NP_001346125; NP_001346126
Location (UCSC)	Chr 4: 75.64 – 75.72 Mb	Chr 5: 92.2 – 92.23 Mb
PubMed search
- Wikidata
View/Edit Human	View/Edit Mouse

Ras GTPase-activating protein-binding protein 2 is an enzyme that in humans is encoded by the G3BP2 gene.

== Interactions ==
G3BP2 has been shown to interact with IκBα.
