= ZFYVE16 =

Protein-coding gene in the species Homo sapiens

Identifiers
- Aliases: ZFYVE16, PPP1R69, zinc finger FYVE-type containing 16
- External IDs: OMIM: 608880; MGI: 2145181; GeneCards: ZFYVE16
Available structures
PDB	Ortholog search: PDBe RCSB
PDB	List of PDB id codes 3T7L

Gene location (Human)
Chr.	Chromosome 5 (human)
Band	5q14.1	Start	80,408,013 bp
Band	5q14.1	End	80,483,379 bp

Gene location (Mouse)
Chr.	Chromosome 13 (mouse)
Band	13|13 C3	Start	92,623,616 bp
Band	13|13 C3	End	92,667,376 bp
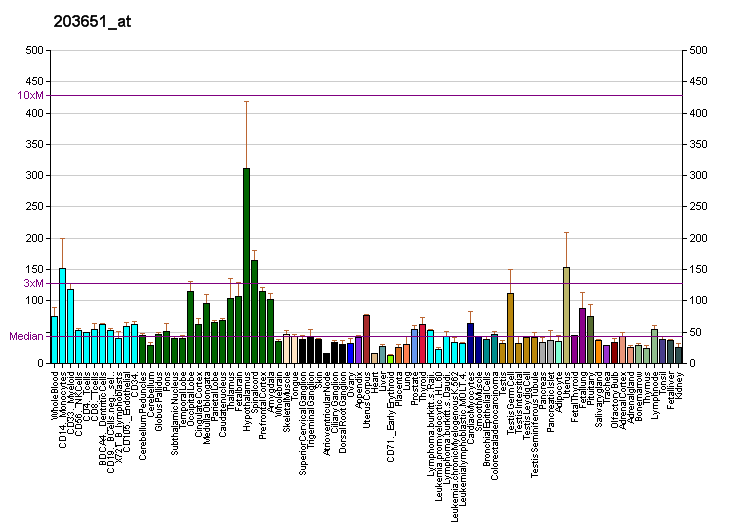
RNA expression pattern
Bgee	Human / Mouse (ortholog); Top expressed in: corpus callosum; endothelial cell; inferior ganglion of vagus nerve; subthalamic nucleus; pars reticulata; inferior olivary nucleus; superior vestibular nucleus; C1 segment; tibia; external globus pallidus / Top expressed in: spermatocyte; genital tubercle; tail of embryo; spermatid; granulocyte; choroid plexus of fourth ventricle; ventricular zone; cumulus cell; urethra; right kidney; More reference expression data
BioGPS	More reference expression data
Gene ontology
Molecular function	1-phosphatidylinositol binding; protein binding; phosphatidylinositol-3,4,5-trisphosphate binding; metal ion binding
Cellular component	endosome; early endosome; early endosome membrane; intracellular membrane-bounded organelle; membrane; cytoplasm; cytosol
Biological process	regulation of endocytosis; endosomal transport; protein targeting to lysosome; BMP signaling pathway; signal transduction; vesicle organization
Sources:Amigo / QuickGO
Orthologs
Databases	NCBI: entry; OMA: entry
Species	Human	Mouse
Entrez	9765	218441
Ensembl	ENSG00000039319	ENSMUSG00000021706
UniProt	Q7Z3T8	Q80U44
RefSeq (mRNA)	NM_001105251; NM_001284236; NM_001284237; NM_014733; NM_001349434	NM_173392
RefSeq (protein)	NP_001098721; NP_001271165; NP_001271166; NP_055548; NP_001336363	NP_775568
Location (UCSC)	Chr 5: 80.41 – 80.48 Mb	Chr 13: 92.62 – 92.67 Mb
PubMed search
- Wikidata
View/Edit Human	View/Edit Mouse

Zinc finger FYVE domain-containing protein 16 is a protein that in humans is encoded by the ZFYVE16 gene.

The ZFYVE16 gene encodes endofin, an endosomal protein implicated in regulating membrane trafficking. It is characterized by the presence of a phosphatidylinositol 3-phosphate-binding FYVE domain positioned in the middle of the molecule.

In melanocytic cells ZFYVE16 gene expression may be regulated by MITF.

== Interactions ==
ZFYVE16 has been shown to interact with TOM1.
