= IKBKG =

Protein-coding gene in humans

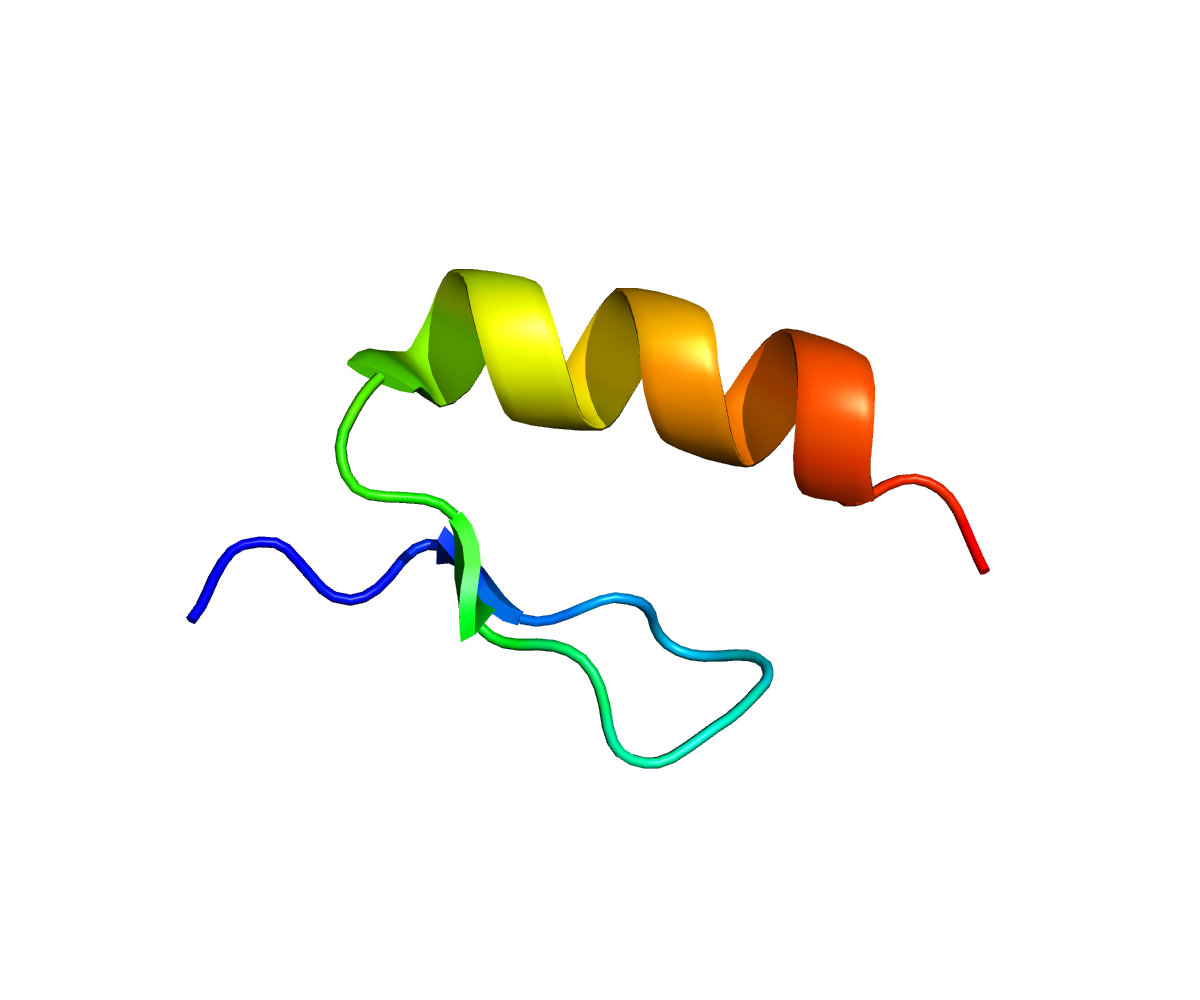

Identifiers
- Aliases: IKBKG, AMCBX1, FIP-3, FIP3, Fip3p, IKK-gamma, IMD33, IP, IP1, IP2, IPD2, NEMO, ZC2HC9, IKKAP1, IKKG, inhibitor of kappa light polypeptide gene enhancer in B-cells, kinase gamma, inhibitor of nuclear factor kappa B kinase subunit gamma, EDAID1, inhibitor of nuclear factor kappa B kinase regulatory subunit gamma
- External IDs: OMIM: 300248; MGI: 1338074; GeneCards: IKBKG
Available structures
PDB	Ortholog search: PDBe RCSB
PDB	List of PDB id codes 2JVX, 2JVY, 3BRT, 3BRV, 3CL3, 3FX0, 4BWN, 5AAY

Gene location (Human)
Chr.	X chromosome (human)
Band	Xq28	Start	154,541,199 bp
Band	Xq28	End	154,565,046 bp

Gene location (Mouse)
Chr.	X chromosome (mouse)
Band	X|X A7.3	Start	73,436,896 bp
Band	X|X A7.3	End	73,497,460 bp
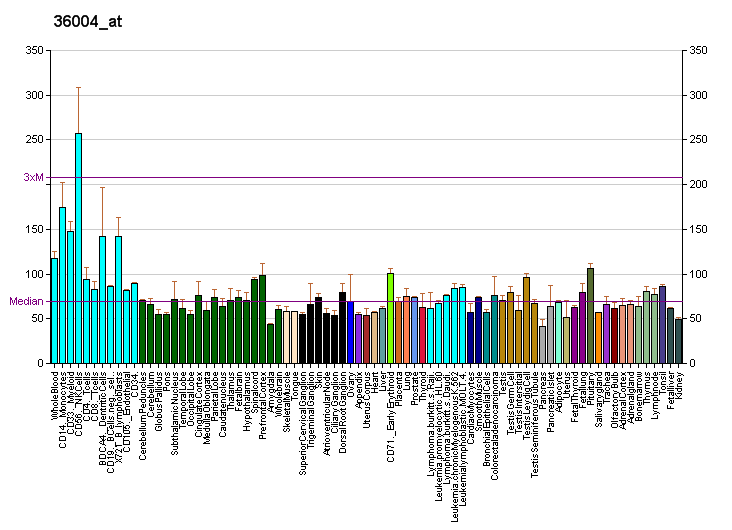

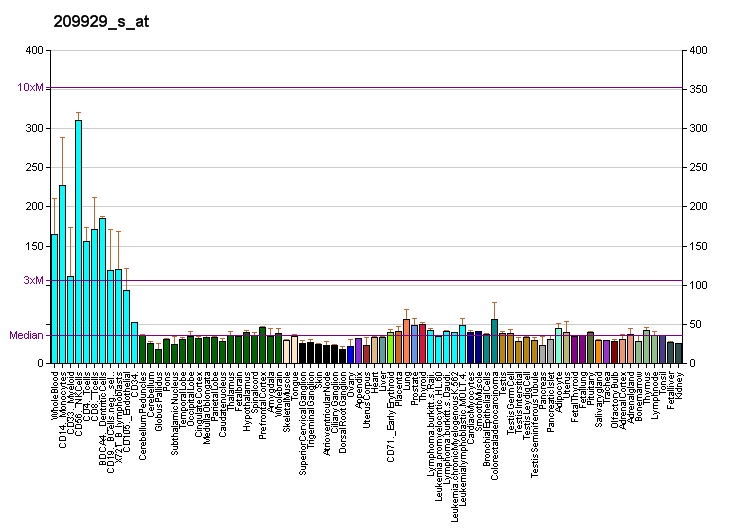
RNA expression pattern
Bgee	Human / Mouse (ortholog); Top expressed in: granulocyte; blood; spleen; right lobe of liver; upper lobe of left lung; right adrenal cortex; left adrenal gland; left adrenal cortex; monocyte; right lung / Top expressed in: left lobe of liver; neural layer of retina; blood; endothelial cell of lymphatic vessel; granulocyte; dentate gyrus of hippocampal formation granule cell; lumbar subsegment of spinal cord; transitional epithelium of urinary bladder; stroma of bone marrow; cardiac muscle tissue of left ventricle; More reference expression data
BioGPS	More reference expression data
Gene ontology
Molecular function	protein homodimerization activity; protein domain specific binding; signal transducer activity; metal ion binding; protein binding; linear polyubiquitin binding; ubiquitin protein ligase binding; identical protein binding; K63-linked polyubiquitin modification-dependent protein binding; peroxisome proliferator activated receptor binding; protein heterodimerization activity
Cellular component	cytoplasm; spindle pole; ubiquitin ligase complex; intracellular anatomical structure; IkappaB kinase complex; mitotic spindle; nucleus; cytosol; nucleoplasm
Biological process	regulation of transcription, DNA-templated; regulation of tumor necrosis factor-mediated signaling pathway; response to virus; stimulatory C-type lectin receptor signaling pathway; transcription, DNA-templated; TRIF-dependent toll-like receptor signaling pathway; Fc-epsilon receptor signaling pathway; JNK cascade; positive regulation of NF-kappaB transcription factor activity; stress-activated MAPK cascade; immune response; positive regulation of I-kappaB kinase/NF-kappaB signaling; innate immune response; inflammatory response; viral process; I-kappaB kinase/NF-kappaB signaling; T cell receptor signaling pathway; nucleotide-binding oligomerization domain containing signaling pathway; establishment of vesicle localization; positive regulation of transcription by RNA polymerase II; negative regulation of neuron death; apoptotic process; antigen processing and presentation of exogenous peptide antigen via MHC class I, TAP-dependent; cellular response to DNA damage stimulus; positive regulation of macroautophagy; protein deubiquitination; anoikis; MyD88-independent toll-like receptor signaling pathway; interleukin-1-mediated signaling pathway
Sources:Amigo / QuickGO
Orthologs
Databases	NCBI: entry; OMA: entry
Species	Human	Mouse
Entrez	8517	16151
Ensembl	ENSG00000269335	ENSMUSG00000004221
UniProt	Q9Y6K9	O88522
RefSeq (mRNA)	NM_001099856; NM_001099857; NM_001145255; NM_003639; NM_001321396 NM_001321397; NM_001377312; NM_001377313; NM_001377314; NM_001377315	NM_001136067; NM_001161421; NM_001161422; NM_001161423; NM_001161424 NM_010547; NM_178590
RefSeq (protein)	NP_001093326; NP_001093327; NP_001138727; NP_001308325; NP_001308326 NP_003630; NP_001364241; NP_001364242; NP_001364243; NP_001364244	NP_001129539; NP_001154893; NP_001154894; NP_001154895; NP_001154896 NP_034677; NP_848705
Location (UCSC)	Chr X: 154.54 – 154.57 Mb	Chr X: 73.44 – 73.5 Mb
PubMed search
- Wikidata
View/Edit Human	View/Edit Mouse

NF-kappa-B essential modulator (NEMO) also known as inhibitor of nuclear factor kappa-B kinase subunit gamma (IKK-γ) is a protein that in humans is encoded by the IKBKG gene. NEMO is a subunit of the IκB kinase complex that activates NF-κB. The human gene for IKBKG is located on the chromosome band Xq28. Multiple transcript variants encoding different isoforms have been found for this gene.

== Function ==
NEMO (IKK-γ) is the regulatory subunit of the inhibitor of IκB kinase (IKK) complex, which activates NF-κB resulting in activation of genes involved in inflammation, immunity, cell survival, and other pathways.

== Clinical significance ==
Mutations in the IKBKG gene results in incontinentia pigmenti, hypohidrotic ectodermal dysplasia, and several other types of immunodeficiencies.

Incontinentia Pigmenti (IP) is an X-linked dominant disease caused by a mutation in the IKBKG gene. Since IKBKG helps activate NF-κB, which protects cells against TNF-alpha induced apoptosis, a lack of IKBKG (and hence a lack of active NF-κB) makes cells more prone to apoptosis.

Moreover, NEMO has been shown to play a role in preeclampsia and may offer insights into the genetic etiology of this condition. An increased level of NEMO gene expression was found in the blood of pregnant women with preeclampsia and their children. However, a decrease of the mRNA levels of total NEMO and the transcripts 1A, 1B, and 1C in placentas derived from preeclamptic women may be the main reason for intensified apoptosis. Sanger sequencing has indicated two distinct variations in the 3’ UTR region of the NEMO gene in preeclamptic women (IKBKG:c.*368C>A and IKBKG:c.*402C>T). The occurrence of a maternal TT genotype and either a TT genotype in the daughter or T allele in the son increases the risk of preeclampsia by 2.59 fold. The configuration of those maternal and fetal genotypes (TT mother/TT daughter or TT mother/T son) is also associated with the level of NEMO gene expression.

NEMO deficiency syndrome is a rare genetic condition relating to a fault in IKBKG. It mostly affects males and has a highly variable set of symptoms and prognoses.

== As a drug target ==
A drug called NEMO Binding Domain (NBD) has been designed to inhibit activation of NF-κB. NBD is a peptide that acts by binding to regulatory subunit NEMO (IKK-γ) thereby preventing it from binding subunits IKK-α and IKK-β and activating the IKK complex. In the absence of regulatory subunit IKK-γ the IKK complex is inactive, preventing the downstream signal transduction cascade leading to NF-κB activation. Binding of IKK-γ to IKK-α and IKK-β subunits activates the IKK complex leading to phosphorylation of IκB kinase, IκBα, and release of NF-κB dimers p105 and RELA to translocate to the nucleus and activate transcription of NF-κB responsive genes. In the presence of the NBD peptide, the IKK complex remains inactive and IκBα sequesters NF-κB dimers in the cytoplasm inhibiting transcription of NF-κB responsive genes. While NF-κB inhibitory drugs have previously been attractive to disease such as chronic inflammation and diabetes, specific cancers have been shown to have constitutive NF-κB activity. Advanced B-cell lymphoma (ABC), a subtype of Diffuse large B-cell lymphoma (DLBCL) has been shown to have fundamental and upregulated NF-κB activity. ABC lymphoma also has the lowest survival rate compared to DLBCL subtypes, Germinal Center B-cell-like and Undefined Type 3 lymphoma, highlighting the great clinical need to define targets for cancer therapy. Notably, the NBD peptide targets the inflammation induced NF-κB activation pathway sparing the protective functions of basal NF-κB activity allowing for greater therapeutic value and fewer undesired side effects.

The NBD peptide was designed by identifying the amino acid binding sequence on IKK-α and IKK-β to which NEMO binds. A small region on the carboxyl terminus of IKK-α (L738-L743) and IKK-β (L737-L742) is essential for a stable interaction with NEMO and for the assembly of the active IKK complex. Henceforth this region is called the NEMO binding domain (NBD). The NBD peptide consists of the region from T735 to E745 of the IKK-β subunit fused with a sequence derived from the Antennapedia homeodomain that mediates membrane translocation. Furthermore, wild type NBD peptide has been shown to dose-dependently inhibit interaction of IKKB with NEMO compared to mutant controls. Additionally, NF-κB activation was suppressed in HeLa cells after incubation with NBD wild type peptides. Moreover, to better understand the potential efficacy of the NBD peptide in suppressing inflammation, NBD peptide was tested on collagen induced rheumatoid arthritis mouse models. Notably, aberrant NF-κB activity is strongly associated with many aspects of the pathology of rheumatoid arthritis. Mice injected with wild-type NBD peptide showed only slightly visual signs of paw and joint swelling whereas mice injected with PBS or mutant NBD control peptides developed severe joint inflammation. Additionally, analysis of the number of osteoclasts present in the joints of rheumatoid arthritic showed to be more prevalent in mice treated with PBS or the mutant NBD peptide compared to the NBD wild type peptide. Markedly, throughout the mouse model studies neither toxicity or lethality nor damage to kidneys or livers, was observed.

Despite the potential for NBD peptide as a viable NF- κB inhibitory drug, disadvantages arise because of its peptide form. Peptides as drugs lack membrane permeability, are poorly orally viable, and generally have lower metabolic stability than small molecule drugs. Therefore, the NBD peptide is unable to be an orally available compound and must be administered either intravenously or via intraperitoneal injection.

== Interactions ==
IKBKG has been shown to interact with:

- BCL10,
- CDC37,
- CHUK and
- IKK2,
- IRAK1,
- NCOA3,
- PPM1B,
- TANK,
- TNFAIP3,
- TRAF3IP2, and
- TRAF6.
