= CHUK =

Protein-coding gene in humans

Identifiers
- Aliases: CHUK, IKBKA, IKK-alpha, IKK1, IKKA, NFKBIKA, TCF16, conserved helix-loop-helix ubiquitous kinase, component of inhibitor of nuclear factor kappa B kinase complex, BPS2
- External IDs: OMIM: 600664; MGI: 99484; GeneCards: CHUK
Available structures
PDB	Ortholog search: PDBe RCSB
PDB	List of PDB id codes 3BRT
Enzyme activity
EC #	BRENDA	ExPASy	KEGG	MetaCyc
2.7.11.10	↗	↗	↗	↗

Gene location (Human)
Chr.	Chromosome 10 (human)
Band	10q24.31	Start	100,188,300 bp
Band	10q24.31	End	100,229,596 bp

Gene location (Mouse)
Chr.	Chromosome 19 (mouse)
Band	19 C3|19 36.71 cM	Start	44,061,774 bp
Band	19 C3|19 36.71 cM	End	44,095,919 bp
RNA expression pattern
Bgee	Human / Mouse (ortholog); Top expressed in: secondary oocyte; middle frontal gyrus; Brodmann area 10; islet of Langerhans; palpebral conjunctiva; germinal epithelium; gingival epithelium; monocyte; gonad; Achilles tendon / Top expressed in: neural layer of retina; right kidney; seminal vesicula; proximal tubule; jejunum; human kidney; liver; epithelium of small intestine; intestinal villus; ventricular zone; More reference expression data
BioGPS	n/a
Gene ontology
Molecular function	transferase activity; protein kinase activity; IkappaB kinase activity; nucleotide binding; protein homodimerization activity; scaffold protein binding; kinase activity; protein serine/threonine kinase activity; protein binding; protein heterodimerization activity; ATP binding; identical protein binding
Cellular component	intracellular membrane-bounded organelle; nucleoplasm; CD40 receptor complex; cytoplasmic side of plasma membrane; IkappaB kinase complex; nucleus; cytoplasm; cytosol
Biological process	response to amino acid; phosphorylation; regulation of tumor necrosis factor-mediated signaling pathway; skeletal muscle contraction; anatomical structure morphogenesis; response to virus; cellular response to tumor necrosis factor; stimulatory C-type lectin receptor signaling pathway; response to hydroperoxide; response to organic substance; TRIF-dependent toll-like receptor signaling pathway; Fc-epsilon receptor signaling pathway; protein phosphorylation; response to lipopolysaccharide; positive regulation of NF-kappaB transcription factor activity; stress-activated MAPK cascade; response to acetate; immune response; Rho protein signal transduction; positive regulation of I-kappaB kinase/NF-kappaB signaling; striated muscle cell differentiation; innate immune response; inflammatory response; T cell receptor signaling pathway; response to toxic substance; positive regulation of transcription by RNA polymerase II; I-kappaB phosphorylation; antigen processing and presentation of exogenous peptide antigen via MHC class I, TAP-dependent; peptidyl-serine phosphorylation; tumor necrosis factor-mediated signaling pathway; I-kappaB kinase/NF-kappaB signaling; cellular response to reactive oxygen species; NIK/NF-kappaB signaling; positive regulation of transcription, DNA-templated; cellular response to cadmium ion; cellular response to virus; negative regulation of NF-kappaB transcription factor activity; MyD88-independent toll-like receptor signaling pathway; interleukin-1-mediated signaling pathway; response to cholecystokinin
Sources:Amigo / QuickGO
Orthologs
Databases	NCBI: entry; OMA: entry
Species	Human	Mouse
Entrez	1147	12675
Ensembl	ENSG00000213341	ENSMUSG00000025199
UniProt	O15111	Q60680
RefSeq (mRNA)	NM_001278; NM_001320928	NM_001162410; NM_007700
RefSeq (protein)	NP_001269; NP_001307857	n/a
Location (UCSC)	Chr 10: 100.19 – 100.23 Mb	Chr 19: 44.06 – 44.1 Mb
PubMed search
- Wikidata
View/Edit Human	View/Edit Mouse

Inhibitor of nuclear factor kappa-B kinase subunit alpha (IKK-α) also known as IKK1 or conserved helix-loop-helix ubiquitous kinase (CHUK) is a protein kinase that in humans is encoded by the CHUK gene. IKK-α is part of the IκB kinase complex that plays an important role in regulating the NF-κB transcription factor. However, IKK-α has many additional cellular targets, and is thought to function independently of the NF-κB pathway to regulate epidermal differentiation.

== Function ==
=== NF-κB response ===
IKK-α is a member of the serine/threonine protein kinase family and forms a complex in the cell with IKK-β and NEMO. NF-κB transcription factors are normally held in an inactive state by the inhibitory proteins IκBs. IKK-α and IKK-β phosphorylate the IκB proteins, marking them for degradation via ubiquitination and allowing NF-κB transcription factors to go into the nucleus.

Once activated, NF-κB transcription factors regulate genes that are implicated in many important cellular processes, including immune response, inflammation, cell death, and cell proliferation.

=== Epidermal differentiation ===
IKK-α has been shown to function in epidermal differentiation independently of the NF-κB pathway. In the mouse, IKK-α is required for cell cycle exit and differentiation of the embryonic keratinocytes. IKK-α null mice have a truncated snout and limbs, shiny skin, and die shortly after birth due to dehydration. Their epidermis retains a proliferative precursor cell population and lacks the outer two most differentiated cell layers. This function of IKK-α has been shown to be independent of the protein's kinase activity and of the NF-κB pathway. Instead it is thought that IKK-α regulates skin differentiation by acting as a cofactor in the TGF-β / Smad2/3 signaling pathway.

The zebrafish homolog of IKK-α has also been shown to play a role in the differentiation of the embryonic epithelium. Zebrafish embryos born from mothers that are mutant in IKK-α do not produce a differentiated outer epithelial monolayer. Instead, the outermost cells in these embryos are hyperproliferative and fail to turn on critical epidermal genes. Different domains of the protein are required for this function of IKK-α in zebrafish than in mice, but in neither case does the NF-κB pathway seem to be implicated.

=== Keratinocyte migration ===
IκB kinase α (IKKα) is a regulator of keratinocyte terminal differentiation and proliferation and plays a role in skin cancer.

Activation of three major hydrogen peroxide-dependent pathways, EGF, FOXO1, and IKK-α occur during injury-induced epidermal keratinocyte migration, adhesion, cytoprotection and wound healing. IKKα regulates human keratinocyte migration by surveillance of the redox environment after wounding. IKK-α is sulfenylated at a conserved cysteine residue in the kinase domain, which correlated with derepression of EGF promoter activity and increased EGF expression, indicating that IKK-α stimulates migration through dynamic interactions with the EGF promoter depending on the redox state within cells.

=== Other cellular targets ===
IKK-α has also been reported to regulate the cell cycle protein cyclin D1 in an NF-κB-independent manner.

== Clinical significance ==
Inhibition of IκB kinase (IKK) and IKK-related kinases, IKBKE (IKKε) and TANK-binding kinase 1 (TBK1), has been investigated as a therapeutic option for the treatment of inflammatory diseases and cancer.

Mutations in IKK-α in humans have been linked to lethal fetal malformations. The phenotype of these mutant fetuses is similar to the mouse IKK-α null phenotype, and is characterized by shiny, thickened skin and truncated limbs.

Decreased IKK-α activity has been reported in a large percentage of human squamous cell carcinomas, and restoring IKK-α in mouse models of skin cancer has been shown to have an anti-tumorigenic effect.

== Interactions ==
IKK-α has been shown to interact with:

- HDAC9,
- AKT1,
- CTNNB1,
- FANCA,
- IKBKG
- IKK2,
- IRAK1,
- MAP3K14,
- MAP3K7,
- MAP3K8,
- NFKBIA,
- NCOA3,
- PPM1B,
- PRKDC, and
- TRAF2.
