= IkappaB kinase =

Class of enzymes

Identifiers
- EC no.: 2.7.11.10
- CAS no.: 159606-08-3

Databases
- BRENDA: enzyme data
- ExPASy: NiceZyme view
- KEGG: enzyme entry
- MetaCyc: metabolic pathway
- Rhea: reactions
- PDB structures: RCSB PDB PDBe PDBsum
- Gene Ontology: AmiGO / QuickGO
Search
- PMC: articles
- PubMed: articles
- NCBI: proteins

The IκB kinase (IkappaB kinase or IKK) is an enzyme complex that is involved in propagating the cellular response to inflammation, specifically the regulation of lymphocytes.

The IκB kinase enzyme complex is part of the upstream NF-κB signal transduction cascade. The IκBα (inhibitor of nuclear factor kappa B) protein inactivates the NF-κB transcription factor by masking the nuclear localization signals (NLS) of NF-κB proteins and keeping them sequestered in an inactive state in the cytoplasm. Specifically, IKK phosphorylates the inhibitory IκBα protein. This phosphorylation results in the dissociation of IκBα from NF-κB. NF-κB, which is now free, migrates into the nucleus and activates the expression of at least 150 genes; some of which are anti-apoptotic.

== Catalyzed reaction ==
In enzymology, an IκB kinase (EC 2.7.11.10) is an enzyme that catalyzes the chemical reaction:

ATP + IκB protein $\rightleftharpoons$ ADP + IκB phosphoprotein

Thus, the two substrates of this enzyme are ATP and IκB protein, whereas its two products are ADP and IκB phosphoprotein.

This enzyme belongs to the family of transferases, specifically those transferring a phosphate group to the sidechain oxygen atom of serine or threonine residues in proteins (protein-serine/threonine kinases). The systematic name of this enzyme class is ATP:[IκB protein] phosphotransferase.

== Structure ==
The IκB kinase complex is composed of three subunits each encoded by a separate gene:

- IKK-α (also known as IKK1) (CHUK)
- IKK-β (also known as IKK2) (IKBKB)
- IKK-γ (also known as NEMO) (IKBKG)

The α- and β-subunits together are catalytically active whereas the γ-subunit serves a regulatory function.

The IKK-α and IKK-β kinase subunits are homologous in structure, composed of a kinase domain, as well as leucine zipper and helix-loop-helix dimerization domains, and a carboxy-terminal NEMO-binding domain (NBD). Mutational studies have revealed the identity of the NBD amino acid sequence as leucine-aspartate-tryptophan-serine-tryptophan-leucine, encoded by residues 737-742 and 738-743 of IKK-α and IKK-β, respectively. The regulatory IKK-γ subunit, or NEMO, is composed of two coiled coil domains, a leucine zipper dimerization domain, and a zinc finger-binding domain. Specifically, the NH2-terminus of NEMO binds to the NBD sequences on IKK-α and IKK-β, leaving the rest of NEMO accessible for interacting with regulatory proteins.

conserved helix-loop-helix ubiquitous kinase

Identifiers
- Symbol: CHUK
- Alt. symbols: IKK-alpha, IKK1, TCF16
- NCBI gene: 1147
- HGNC: 1974
- OMIM: 600664
- RefSeq: NM_001278
- UniProt: O15111

Other data
- EC number: 2.7.11.10
- Locus: Chr. 10 q24-q25
Search for
- Structures: Swiss-model
- Domains: InterPro

inhibitor of kappa light polypeptide gene enhancer in B-cells, kinase beta

Identifiers
- Symbol: IKBKB
- Alt. symbols: IKK-beta, IKK2
- NCBI gene: 3551
- HGNC: 5960
- OMIM: 603258
- RefSeq: NM_001556
- UniProt: O14920

Other data
- EC number: 2.7.11.10
- Locus: Chr. 8 p11.2
Search for
- Structures: Swiss-model
- Domains: InterPro

inhibitor of kappa light polypeptide gene enhancer in B-cells, kinase gamma

Identifiers
- Symbol: IKBKG
- Alt. symbols: IKK-gamma, NEMO, IP2, IP1
- NCBI gene: 8517
- HGNC: 5961
- OMIM: 300248
- RefSeq: NM_003639
- UniProt: Q9Y6K9

Other data
- Locus: Chr. X q28
Search for
- Structures: Swiss-model
- Domains: InterPro

== Function ==
IκB kinase activity is essential for activation of members of the nuclear factor-kB (NF-κB) family of transcription factors, which play a fundamental role in lymphocyte immunoregulation. Activation of the canonical, or classical, NF-κB pathway begins in response to stimulation by various pro-inflammatory stimuli, including lipopolysaccharide (LPS) expressed on the surface of pathogens, or the release of pro-inflammatory cytokines such as tumor necrosis factor (TNF) or interleukin-1 (IL-1). Following immune cell stimulation, a signal transduction cascade leads to the activation of the IKK complex, an event characterized by the binding of NEMO to the homologous kinase subunits IKK-α and IKK-β. The IKK complex phosphorylates serine residues (S32 and S36) within the amino-terminal domain of inhibitor of NF-κB (IκBα) upon activation, consequently leading to its ubiquitination and subsequent degradation by the proteasome. Degradation of IκBα releases the prototypical p50-p65 dimer for translocation to the nucleus, where it binds to κB sites and directs NF-κB-dependent transcriptional activity. NF-κB target genes can be differentiated by their different functional roles within lymphocyte immunoregulation and include positive cell-cycle regulators, anti-apoptotic and survival factors, and pro-inflammatory genes. Collectively, activation of these immunoregulatory factors promotes lymphocyte proliferation, differentiation, growth, and survival.

== Regulation ==
Activation of the IKK complex is dependent on phosphorylation of serine residues within the kinase domain of IKK-β, though IKK-α phosphorylation occurs concurrently in endogenous systems. Recruitment of IKK kinases by the regulatory domains of NEMO leads to the phosphorylation of two serine residues within the activation loop of IKK-β, moving the activation loop away from the catalytic pocket, thus allowing access to ATP and IκBα peptide substrates. Furthermore, the IKK complex is capable of undergoing trans-autophosphorylation, where the activated IKK-β kinase subunit phosphorylates its adjacent IKK-α subunit, as well as other inactive IKK complexes, thus resulting in high levels of IκB kinase activity. Following IKK-mediated phosphorylation of IκBα and the subsequent decrease in IκB abundance, the activated IKK kinase subunits undergo extensive carboxy-terminal autophosphorylation, reaching a low activity state that is further susceptible to complete inactivation by phosphatases once upstream inflammatory signaling diminishes.

== Deregulation and disease ==
Though functionally adaptive in response to inflammatory stimuli, deregulation of NF-κB signaling has been exploited in various disease states. Increased NF-κB activity as a result of constitutive IKK-mediated phosphorylation of IκBα has been observed in the development of atherosclerosis, asthma, rheumatoid arthritis, inflammatory bowel diseases, and multiple sclerosis. Specifically, constitutive NF-κB activity promotes continuous inflammatory signaling at the molecular level that translates to chronic inflammation phenotypically. Furthermore, the ability of NF-κB to simultaneously suppress apoptosis and promote continuous lymphocyte growth and proliferation explains its intimate connection with many types of cancer.

== Clinical significance ==
This enzyme participates in 15 pathways related to metabolism: MapK signaling, apoptosis, Toll-like receptor signaling, T-cell receptor signaling, B-cell receptor signaling, insulin signaling, adipokine signaling, Type 2 diabetes mellitus, epithelial cell signaling in helicobacter pylori, pancreatic cancer, prostate cancer, chronic myeloid leukemia, acute myeloid leukemia, and small cell lung cancer.

Inhibition of IκB kinase (IKK) and IKK-related kinases, IKBKE (IKKε) and TANK-binding kinase 1 (TBK1), has been investigated as a therapeutic option for the treatment of inflammatory diseases and cancer. The small-molecule inhibitor of IKK-β SAR113945, developed by Sanofi-Aventis, was evaluated in patients with knee osteoarthritis.
