= IKBKB =

Protein-coding gene in the species Homo sapiens

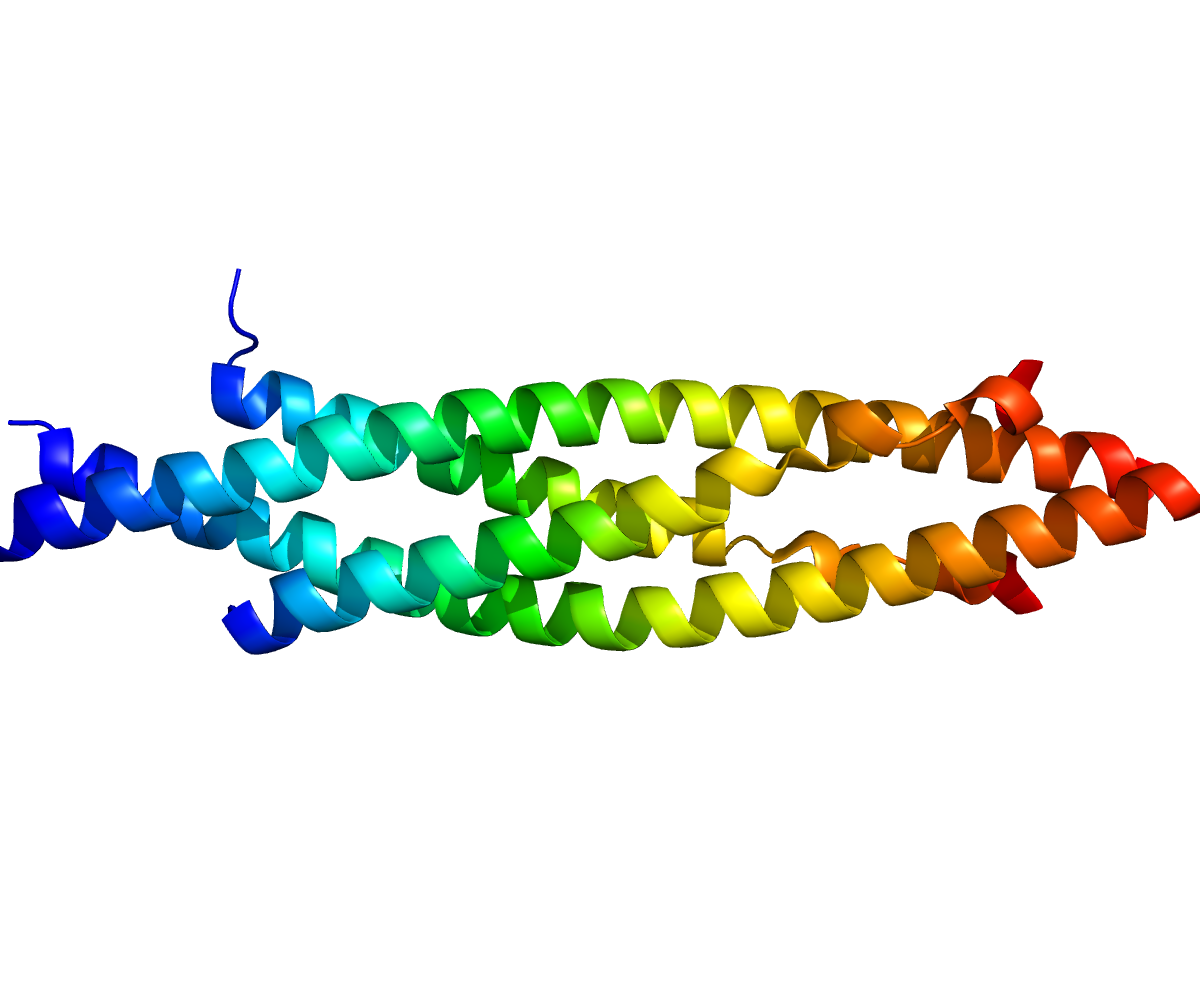

Identifiers
- Aliases: IKBKB, IKK-beta, IKK2, IKKB, IMD15, NFKBIKB, inhibitor of kappa light polypeptide gene enhancer in B-cells, kinase beta, inhibitor of nuclear factor kappa B kinase subunit beta, IMD15A, IMD15B
- External IDs: OMIM: 603258; MGI: 1338071; GeneCards: IKBKB
Available structures
PDB	Ortholog search: PDBe RCSB
PDB	List of PDB id codes 4KIK, 3BRT, 3BRV, 4E3C
Enzyme activity
EC #	BRENDA	ExPASy	KEGG	MetaCyc
2.7.11.1	↗	↗	↗	↗
2.7.11.10	↗	↗	↗	↗

Gene location (Human)
Chr.	Chromosome 8 (human)
Band	8p11.21	Start	42,271,302 bp
Band	8p11.21	End	42,332,460 bp

Gene location (Mouse)
Chr.	Chromosome 8 (mouse)
Band	8|8 A2	Start	23,149,228 bp
Band	8|8 A2	End	23,196,605 bp
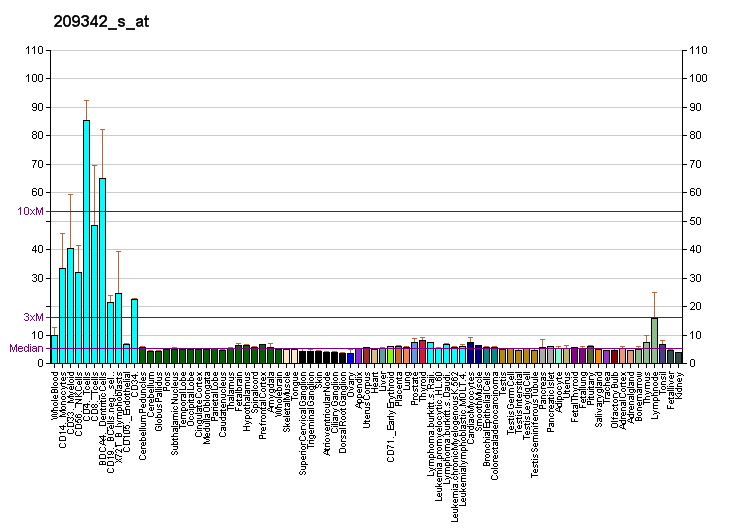

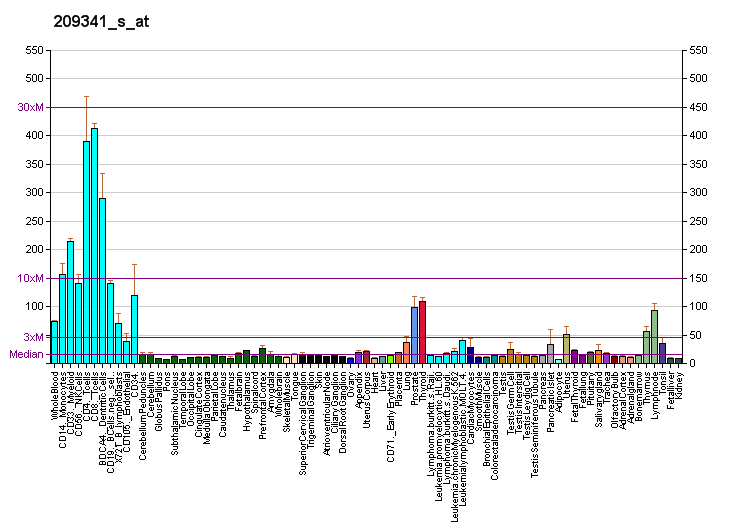

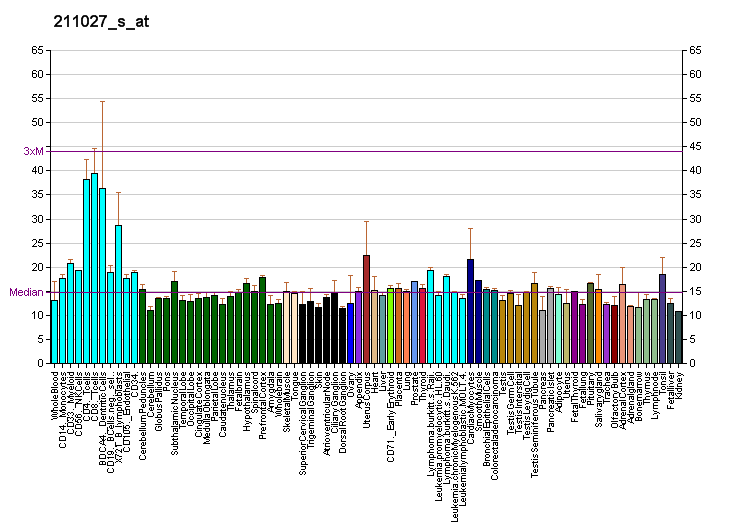
RNA expression pattern
Bgee	Human / Mouse (ortholog); Top expressed in: spleen; granulocyte; right lobe of thyroid gland; right uterine tube; skin of leg; skin of abdomen; minor salivary glands; left lobe of thyroid gland; tonsil; vagina / Top expressed in: mesenteric lymph nodes; blood; Paneth cell; crypt of lieberkuhn of small intestine; hair follicle; molar; medullary collecting duct; superior cervical ganglion; stroma of bone marrow; spleen; More reference expression data
BioGPS	More reference expression data
Gene ontology
Molecular function	transferase activity; protein kinase activity; IkappaB kinase activity; nucleotide binding; protein homodimerization activity; scaffold protein binding; kinase activity; protein binding; ATP binding; protein kinase binding; protein heterodimerization activity; protein serine/threonine kinase activity; identical protein binding
Cellular component	membrane; membrane raft; CD40 receptor complex; cytoplasmic side of plasma membrane; nucleus; IkappaB kinase complex; cytoplasm; cytosol
Biological process	phosphorylation; regulation of tumor necrosis factor-mediated signaling pathway; cellular response to tumor necrosis factor; response to virus; regulation of phosphorylation; negative regulation of apoptotic process; stimulatory C-type lectin receptor signaling pathway; T cell receptor signaling pathway; TRIF-dependent toll-like receptor signaling pathway; Fc-epsilon receptor signaling pathway; positive regulation of transcription, DNA-templated; protein phosphorylation; negative regulation of bicellular tight junction assembly; stress-activated MAPK cascade; positive regulation of I-kappaB kinase/NF-kappaB signaling; negative regulation of myosin-light-chain-phosphatase activity; innate immune response; inflammatory response; I-kappaB kinase/NF-kappaB signaling; cortical actin cytoskeleton organization; positive regulation of transcription by RNA polymerase II; regulation of establishment of endothelial barrier; I-kappaB phosphorylation; tumor necrosis factor-mediated signaling pathway; positive regulation of NF-kappaB transcription factor activity; antigen processing and presentation of exogenous peptide antigen via MHC class I, TAP-dependent; anatomical structure morphogenesis; protein localization to plasma membrane; MyD88-independent toll-like receptor signaling pathway; peptidyl-serine phosphorylation; interleukin-1-mediated signaling pathway; viral process
Sources:Amigo / QuickGO
Orthologs
Databases	NCBI: entry; OMA: entry
Species	Human	Mouse
Entrez	3551	16150
Ensembl	ENSG00000104365	ENSMUSG00000031537
UniProt	O14920	O88351
RefSeq (mRNA)	NM_001190720; NM_001190721; NM_001190722; NM_001242778; NM_001556	NM_001159774; NM_010546
RefSeq (protein)	NP_001177649; NP_001229707; NP_001547	NP_001153246; NP_034676
Location (UCSC)	Chr 8: 42.27 – 42.33 Mb	Chr 8: 23.15 – 23.2 Mb
PubMed search
- Wikidata
View/Edit Human	View/Edit Mouse

IKK-β also known as inhibitor of nuclear factor kappa-B kinase subunit beta is a protein that in humans is encoded by the IKBKB (inhibitor of kappa light polypeptide gene enhancer in B-cells, kinase beta) gene.

== Function ==
IKK-β is an enzyme that serves as a protein subunit of IκB kinase, which is a component of the cytokine-activated intracellular signaling pathway involved in triggering immune responses. IKK's activity causes activation of a transcription factor known as Nuclear Transcription factor kappa-B or NF-κB. Activated IKK-β phosphorylates a protein called the inhibitor of NF-κB, IκB (IκBα), which binds NF-κB to inhibit its function. Phosphorylated IκB is degraded via the ubiquitination pathway, freeing NF-κB, and allowing its entry into the nucleus of the cell where it activates various genes involved in inflammation and other immune responses.

== Clinical significance ==
IKK-β plays a significant role in brain cells following a stroke. If NF-κB activation by IKK-β is blocked, damaged cells within the brain stay alive, and according to a study performed by the University of Heidelberg and the University of Ulm, the cells even appear to make some recovery.

Inhibition of IKK and IKK-related kinases has been investigated as a therapeutic option for the treatment of inflammatory diseases and cancer. The small-molecule inhibitor of IKK2 SAR113945, developed by Sanofi-Aventis, was evaluated in patients with knee osteoarthritis.

== Interactions ==
IKK-β (IKBKB) has been shown to interact with

- HDAC9,
- CDC37,
- CHUK
- CTNNB1,
- FANCA,
- IKBKG
- IRAK1,
- NFKBIA,
- MAP3K14,
- NFKB1,
- NFKBIB,
- NCOA3,
- PPM1B,
- TNFRSF1A, and
- TRAF2.

== See also ==
- IκB kinase
