= Incontinentia pigmenti =

Rare X-linked dominant genetic disorder

- Other names: Bloch–Siemens syndrome, Bloch–Sulzberger disease, Bloch–Sulzberger syndrome, melanoblastosis cutis, nevus pigmentosus systematicus
- This condition is inherited in an X-linked dominant manner.
- Specialty: Medical genetics
- Frequency: 0.0005%

Incontinentia pigmenti (IP) is a rare X-linked dominant genetic disorder that affects the skin, hair, teeth, nails and central nervous system. It is named from its appearance under a microscope.

The disease is characterized by skin abnormalities that begin in childhood, usually a blistering rash which heals, followed by the development of harder skin growths. The skin may develop grey or brown patches which fade with time. Other symptoms can include hair loss, dental abnormalities, eye abnormalities that can lead to vision loss and lined or pitted fingernails and toenails. Associated problems can include delayed development, intellectual disability, seizures and other neurological problems. Most males with the disease do not survive to childbirth.

Incontinentia pigmenti is caused by a mutation in the IKBKG gene, which encodes the NEMO protein, which serves to protect cells against TNF-alpha-induced apoptosis. A lack of IKBKG therefore makes cells more prone to apoptosis.

There is no specific treatment; individual conditions must be managed by specialists.

== Presentation ==
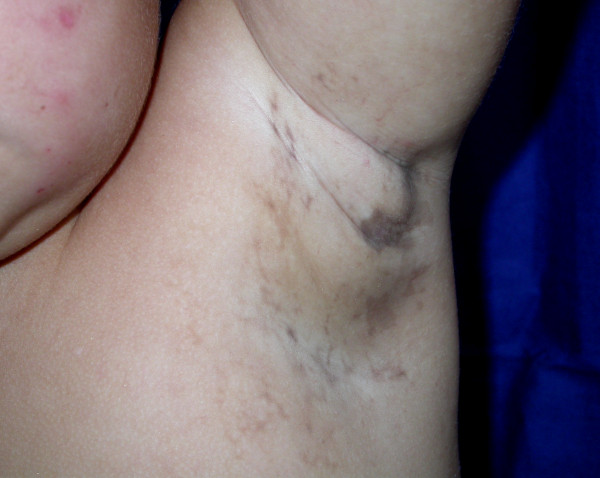
Incontinentia pigmenti forming along Blaschko's lines in a three-year-old girl

The skin lesions evolve through characteristic stages:

1. blistering (from birth to about four months of age),
2. a wart-like rash (for several months),
3. swirling macular hyperpigmentation (from about six months of age into adulthood), followed by
4. linear hypopigmentation.

Alopecia, dental anomalies, and dystrophic nails are observed. Some patients have retinal vascular abnormalities predisposing to retinal detachment in early childhood. Cognitive delays or intellectual disability are occasionally seen.The discolored skin is caused by excessive deposits of melanin (normal skin pigment). Most newborns with IP will develop discolored skin within the first two weeks. The pigmentation involves the trunk and extremities, is slate-grey, blue or brown, and is distributed in irregular marbled or wavy lines. The discoloration sometimes fades with age.

Neurological problems can include cerebral atrophy, the formation of small cavities in the central white matter of the brain, and the loss of neurons in the cerebellar cortex. About 20% of children with IP will have slow motor development, muscle weakness in one or both sides of the body, intellectual disability, and seizures. They are also likely to have visual problems, which can include: crossed eyes, cataracts, retinal detachment, and severe visual loss. Dental problems are also common, and can include hypodontia, abnormally shaped teeth, and delayed tooth eruption.

Breast anomalies can occur in 1% of patients and can include hypoplasia or supernumerary nipples.Skeletal and structural anomalies can occur in approximately 14% of patients, including:

- Somatic asymmetry
- Hemivertebrae
- Scoliosis
- Spina bifida
- Syndactyly
- Acheiria (congenital absence of the hands—note: other limbs may be affected)
- Ear anomalies
- Extra ribs
- Skull deformities

== Genetics ==
IP is inherited in an X-linked dominant manner. IP is lethal in most, but not all, males. A female with IP may have inherited the IKBKG mutation from either parent or have a new gene mutation. Parents may either be clinically affected or have germline mosaicism. Affected women have a 50% risk of transmitting the mutant IKBKG allele at conception; however, most affected male conceptuses miscarry. Thus, the effective ratio for liveborn children from a mother carrying the mutation is 33% unaffected females, 33% affected females, and 33% unaffected males. Genetic counseling, prenatal testing, and preimplantation genetic diagnosis is available.

In females, the cells expressing the mutated IKBKG gene due to lyonization selectively die around the time of birth, so the X-inactivation is extremely skewed.IP is caused by mutations in a gene called NEMO (NF-κB essential modulator).

== Diagnosis ==
The diagnosis of IP is established by clinical findings and occasionally by corroborative skin biopsy. Molecular genetic testing of the NEMO IKBKG gene (chromosomal locus Xq28) reveals disease-causing mutations in about 80% of probands. Such testing is available clinically. In addition, females with IP have skewed X-chromosome inactivation; testing for this can be used to support the diagnosis. Many people in the past were misdiagnosed with a second type of IP, formerly known as IP1. This has now been given its own name: Hypomelanosis of Ito (incontinentia pigmenti achromians). This has a slightly different presentation: swirls or streaks of hypopigmentation and depigmentation. It is not inherited and does not involve skin stages 1 or 2. Some 33–50% of patients have multisystem involvement—eye, skeletal, and neurological abnormalities. Its chromosomal locus is at Xp11, rather than Xq28.

== Treatment ==
There does not yet exist a specific treatment for IP. Treatment can only address the individual symptoms.

== History ==
This disorder was first reported by Swiss dermatologist Bruno Bloch in 1926 and American dermatologist Marion Sulzberger in 1928.

== See also ==
- List of cutaneous conditions
- List of radiographic findings associated with cutaneous conditions
- List of dental abnormalities associated with cutaneous conditions
