= Atopy =

Predisposition towards allergy

- Other names: Atopic syndrome
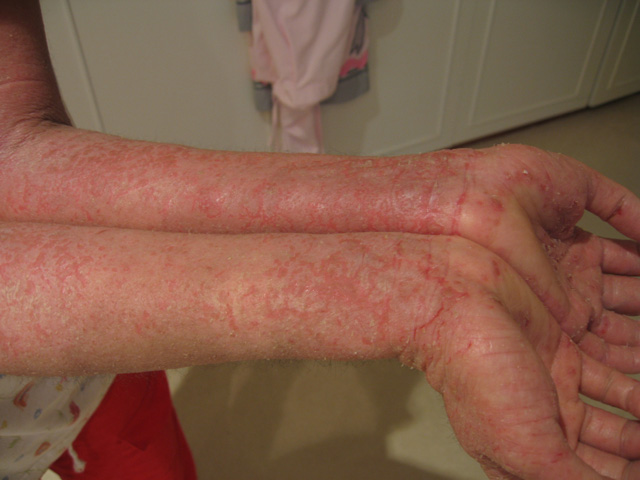
- Eczema—a typical atopic manifestation
- Pronunciation: /ˈætəpiː/
- Specialty: Dermatology, immunology

Atopy is the tendency to produce an exaggerated immunoglobulin E (IgE) immune response to otherwise harmless substances in the environment. Allergic diseases are clinical manifestations of such inappropriate, atopic responses.

Atopy may have a hereditary component, although contact with the allergen or irritant must occur before the hypersensitivity reaction can develop (characteristically after re-exposure). Maternal psychological trauma during pregnancy may also be a strong indicator for development of atopy.

The term atopy was coined by Arthur F. Coca and Robert Cooke in 1923 from the Greek ἀτοπία meaning "the state of being out of place", "absurdity". Many physicians and scientists use the term atopy for any reaction mediated by IgE (even those that are appropriate and proportional to the antigen), but many pediatricians reserve it to refer only to a genetically mediated predisposition to an excessive IgE reaction.

== Signs and symptoms ==
Atopic sensitization is considered in the case of a person having IgE positivity or a prick test positivity to any common food- or air-borne allergen. Atopic conditions are considered: atopic dermatitis, allergic rhinitis (hay fever), allergic asthma, atopic keratoconjunctivitis. The likelihood of having asthma, rhinitis and atopic dermatitis together is 10 times higher than could be expected by chance. Atopy is more common among individuals with a number of different conditions, such as eosinophilic esophagitis and non-celiac gluten sensitivity.

Allergic reactions can range from sneezing and rhinorrhoea to anaphylaxis and even death.

== Pathophysiology ==
In an allergic reaction, initial exposure to an otherwise harmless exogenous substance (known as an allergen) triggers the production of specific IgE antibodies by activated B cells. These IgE antibodies bind to the surface of mast cells via high-affinity IgE receptors, a step that is not itself associated with a clinical response. However, upon re-exposure, the allergen binds to membrane-bound IgE which activates the mast cells, releasing a variety of mediators. This type I hypersensitivity reaction is the basis of the symptoms of allergic reactions, which range from sneezing and rhinorrhoea to anaphylaxis. Allergens can be a number of different substances, for example pollen, dander, dust mites, and foods.

== Causes ==
Atopic reactions are caused by localized hypersensitivity reactions to an allergen. Atopy appears to show a strong hereditary component. One study concludes that the risk of developing atopic dermatitis (3%) or atopy in general (7%) "increases by a factor of two with each first-degree family member already suffering from atopy". As well, maternal stress and perinatal programming is increasingly understood as a root cause of atopy, finding that "...trauma may be a particularly robust potentiator of the cascade of biological events that increase vulnerability to atopy and may help explain the increased risk found in low-income urban populations."

Environmental factors are also thought to play a role in the development of atopy, and the 'hygiene hypothesis' is one of the models that may explain the steep rise in the incidence of atopic diseases, though this hypothesis is incomplete and in some cases, contradictory to findings. This hypothesis proposes that excess 'cleanliness' in an infant's or child's environment can lead to a decline in the number of infectious stimuli that are necessary for the proper development of the immune system. The decrease in exposure to infectious stimuli may result in an imbalance between the infectious-response ("protective") elements and the allergic-response ("false alarm") elements within the immune system.

Some studies also suggest that the maternal diet during pregnancy may be a causal factor in atopic diseases (including asthma) in offspring, suggesting that consumption of antioxidants, certain lipids, and/or a Mediterranean diet may help to prevent atopic diseases.

The multicenter PARSIFAL study in 2006, involving 6,630 children age 5 to 13 in 5 European countries, suggested that reduced use of antibiotics and antipyretics is associated with a reduced risk of allergic disease in children.

=== Genetics ===
There is a strong genetic predisposition toward atopic allergies, especially on the maternal side. Because of the strong familial evidence, investigators have tried to map susceptibility genes for atopy. Genes for atopy (C11orf30, STAT6, SLC25A46, HLA-DQB1, IL1RL1/IL18R1, TLR1/TLR6/TLR10, LPP, MYC/PVT1, IL2/ADAD1, HLA-B/MICA) tend to be involved in allergic responses or other components of the immune system. The gene C11orf30 seems to be the most relevant for atopy as it may increase susceptibility to poly-sensitization.

=== Staphylococcus aureus ===
Bleach baths provide temporary control of eczema. Ciprofloxacin is an allergen that may cause contact dermatitis, symptoms of which are indistinguishable from eczema. Filaggrin mutations are associated with atopic eczema and may contribute to the excessive dryness of the skin and the loss of the barrier function of normal skin. It may be possible that the filaggrin mutations and the loss of the normal skin barrier expose crevices that make it possible for Staphylococcus aureus to colonize the skin. Atopic eczema is often associated with genetic defects in genes that control allergic responses. Thus, some investigators have proposed that atopic eczema is an allergic response to increased Staphylococcus aureus colonization of the skin. A hallmark indicator of atopic eczema is a positive wheal and flare reaction to a skin test of S. aureus antigens. In addition, several studies have documented that an IgE-mediated response to S. aureus is present in people with atopic eczema.

== Changes in prevalence over time ==
In adults, the prevalence of IgE sensitization to allergens from house dust mite and cat, but not grass, seems to decrease over time as people age. However, the biological reasons for these changes are not fully understood.

== Treatments ==
Treatments for atopic disorders depend on the organ(s) involved. They can vary from local treatment options, often topical corticosteroids, to systemic treatment options with oral corticosteroids, biological treatments (e.g. omalizumab, mepolizumab) or allergen immunotherapy.

== See also ==
- Eczema
- Asthma
- Rhinitis
- Anaphylaxis
- Allergic march
