= Marion Sulzberger =

American dermatologist

Marion Baldur Sulzberger
- Born: May 12, 1895
- Died: November 23, 1983 (aged 88)
- Known for: dermatology
- Scientific career
- Fields: medicine

Marion Baldur Sulzberger (12 May 1895 - 23 November 1983) was an American dermatologist known for major contributions in his discipline.

== Early life ==
Marion Baldur Sulzberger was born in New York City on March 12, 1895. After graduating from Franklin School, he attended Pennsylvania Military College and then Harvard University. He left Harvard after his first year. He was a pilot for the US Navy during World War I.

== Career ==
He received his training in dermatology in Zurich (Switzerland) from 1926 to 1929. In 1928, two years after the Swiss dermatologist Bruno Bloch, he published a paper on a syndrome later on named Bloch-Sulzberger syndrome.

He practiced dermatology in New York City from 1929 to 1961. He also taught dermatology at New York Post-Graduate Medical School, which was then part of Columbia University. In 1949, he was the George Miller MacKee Professor and chairman of the Department of Dermatology at New York University Medical Center. He was named professor emeritus in 1960.

Sulzberger was the first technical director of the Letterman Army Institute of Research in San Francisco. He was a clinical professor of dermatology at the University of California at San Francisco and was nemed emeritus professor in 1975.

In addition to his scientific achievements, he helped found the Journal of Investigative Dermatology and the Society of Investigative Dermatology, and served on the first board of directors of the American Academy of Dermatology.

Sulzberger published more than 400 scientific articles. A pivotal paper of Sulzberger and Witten in 1952 on Compound F (later named hydrocortisone) introduced topical glucocorticoids into dermatology.

== See also ==
- List of dermatologists
