= TOLLIP =

Protein-coding gene in the species Homo sapiens

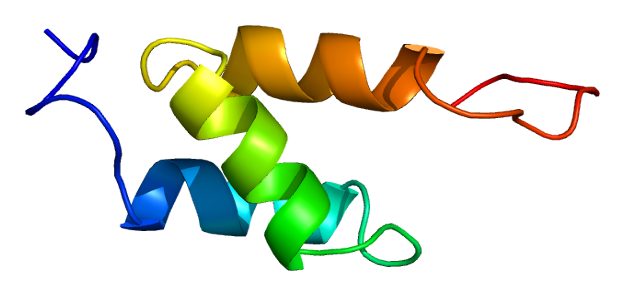

Identifiers
- Aliases: TOLLIP, IL-1RAcPIP, toll interacting protein
- External IDs: OMIM: 606277; MGI: 1891808; GeneCards: TOLLIP
Available structures
PDB	Ortholog search: PDBe RCSB
PDB	List of PDB id codes 1WGL, 2N31

Gene location (Human)
Chr.	Chromosome 11 (human)
Band	11p15.5	Start	1,274,371 bp
Band	11p15.5	End	1,309,654 bp

Gene location (Mouse)
Chr.	Chromosome 7 (mouse)
Band	7|7 F5	Start	141,428,550 bp
Band	7|7 F5	End	141,472,244 bp
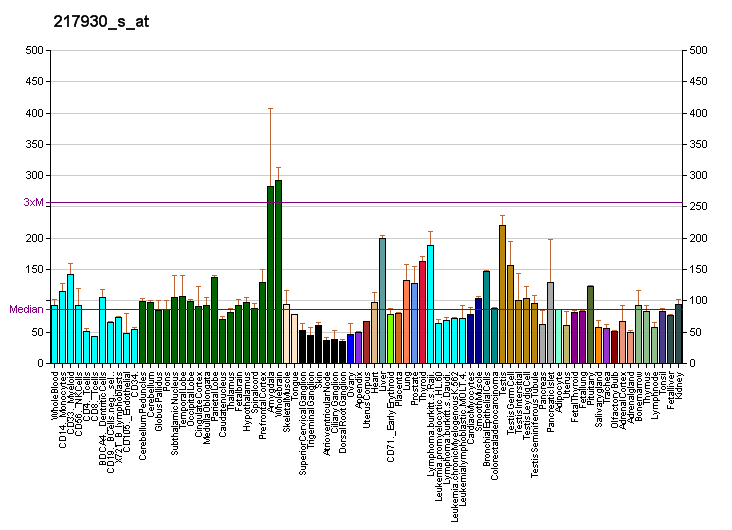
RNA expression pattern
Bgee	Human / Mouse (ortholog); Top expressed in: right frontal lobe; anterior cingulate cortex; prefrontal cortex; left testis; right testis; dorsolateral prefrontal cortex; right lobe of liver; Brodmann area 9; right hemisphere of cerebellum; amygdala / Top expressed in: spermatocyte; ankle joint; dentate gyrus of hippocampal formation granule cell; cumulus cell; spermatid; olfactory epithelium; cerebellar cortex; seminiferous tubule; medial dorsal nucleus; gastrula; More reference expression data
BioGPS	More reference expression data
Gene ontology
Molecular function	signal transducer activity; Toll-like receptor binding; SUMO binding; kinase binding; protein binding; interleukin-1, type I receptor binding; ubiquitin protein ligase binding; ubiquitin conjugating enzyme binding; ubiquitin binding
Cellular component	interleukin-18 receptor complex; cytosol; nuclear body; perinuclear region of cytoplasm; interleukin-1 receptor complex; extracellular exosome; extracellular region; cytoplasm; azurophil granule lumen; specific granule lumen
Biological process	intracellular signal transduction; epithelial cell differentiation; phosphorylation; immune system process; leukocyte activation; cell-cell signaling; positive regulation of protein sumoylation; autophagy; protein localization to endosome; innate immune response; inflammatory response; signal transduction; ubiquitin-dependent protein catabolic process; neutrophil degranulation; interleukin-1-mediated signaling pathway
Sources:Amigo / QuickGO
Orthologs
Databases	NCBI: entry; OMA: entry
Species	Human	Mouse
Entrez	54472	54473
Ensembl	ENSG00000078902	ENSMUSG00000025139
UniProt	Q9H0E2; Q6FIE9	Q9QZ06
RefSeq (mRNA)	NM_019009; NM_001318512; NM_001318514; NM_001318515; NM_001318516	NM_023764; NM_001347562
RefSeq (protein)	NP_001305441; NP_001305443; NP_001305444; NP_001305445; NP_061882 NP_061882.2	NP_001334491; NP_076253
Location (UCSC)	Chr 11: 1.27 – 1.31 Mb	Chr 7: 141.43 – 141.47 Mb
PubMed search
- Wikidata
View/Edit Human	View/Edit Mouse

Toll interacting protein, also known as TOLLIP, is an inhibitory adaptor protein that in humans is encoded by the TOLLIP gene.

== Function and regulation ==
It is an inhibitory adaptor protein within Toll-like receptors (TLR). The TLR pathway is a part of the innate immune system that recognizes structurally conserved molecular patterns of microbial pathogens, leading to an inflammatory immune response.

Tollip interacts with cellular and subcellular membrane compartments such as endosome and lysosome through its C2 domain binding with phosphoinositides. By coordinating organelle communications, Tollip can contribute to the fusion of endo-lysosome and autophagosome. Mice with Tollip deletion exhibit elevated risks for inflammatory diseases such as atherosclerosis and neurodegeneration.

== Clinical significance ==
Polymorphisms in TLR genes have been implicated in various diseases like atopic dermatitis. Recently, variations in the TOLLIP gene have been associated with tuberculosis and idiopathic pulmonary fibrosis.

== Interactions ==
TOLLIP has been shown to interact with TOM1, TLR 2, TLR 4 and IL1RAP.
