= TOM1 =

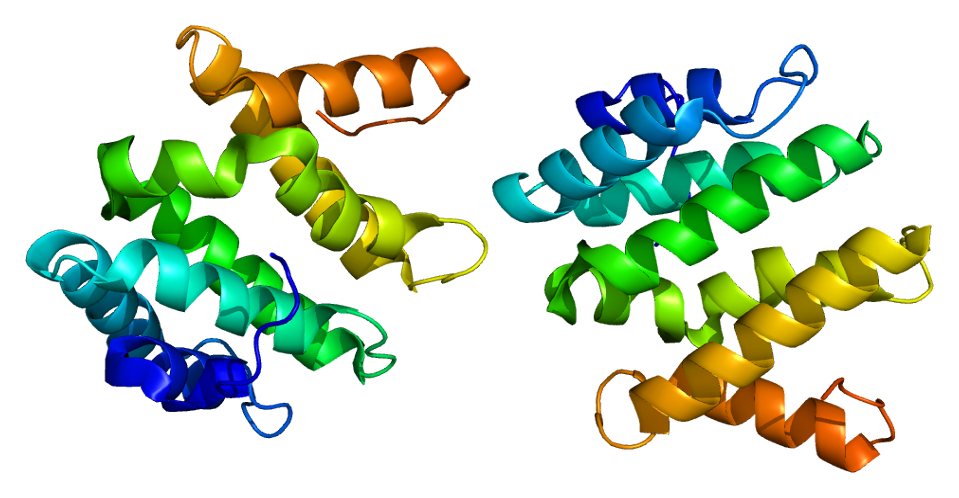
Available structures
PDB	Ortholog search: PDBe RCSB
PDB	List of PDB id codes 1ELK, 1WRD, 2N2N

Identifiers
- Aliases: TOM1, target of myb1 membrane trafficking protein, IMD85
- External IDs: OMIM: 604700; MGI: 1338026; HomoloGene: 88453; GeneCards: TOM1; OMA:TOM1 - orthologs

Gene location (Human)
Chr.	Chromosome 22 (human)
Band	22q12.3	Start	35,299,275 bp
Band	22q12.3	End	35,347,992 bp

Gene location (Mouse)
Chr.	Chromosome 8 (mouse)
Band	8|8 C1	Start	75,760,333 bp
Band	8|8 C1	End	75,796,749 bp
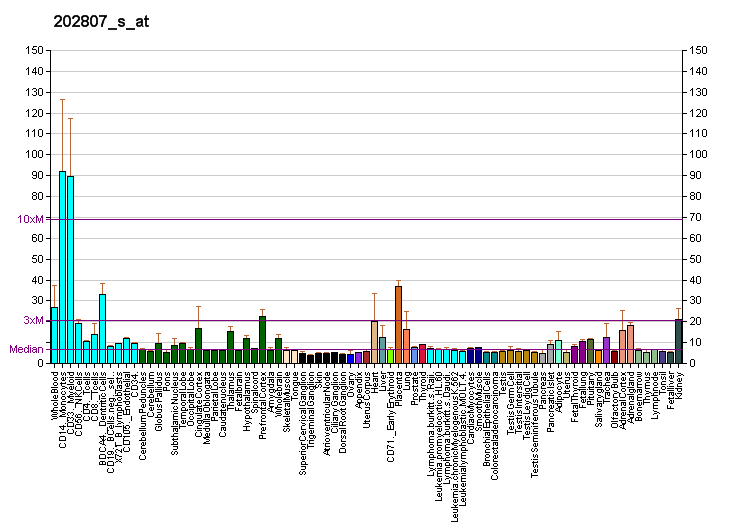
RNA expression pattern
Bgee	Human / Mouse (ortholog); Top expressed in: gastrocnemius muscle; muscle of thigh; skin of leg; skin of abdomen; monocyte; apex of heart; stromal cell of endometrium; minor salivary glands; left adrenal gland; left adrenal cortex / Top expressed in: lens; muscle tissue; skeletal muscle tissue; granulocyte; lip; muscle of thigh; yolk sac; quadriceps femoris muscle; heart; testicle; More reference expression data
BioGPS	More reference expression data
Gene ontology
Molecular function	clathrin binding; protein binding
Cellular component	cytosol; endosome; early endosome; extracellular exosome; intracellular anatomical structure; cytoplasm; membrane; plasma membrane; azurophil granule membrane; specific granule membrane
Biological process	intracellular protein transport; endocytosis; endosomal transport; protein transport; neutrophil degranulation; transport
Sources:Amigo / QuickGO
Orthologs
Species	Human	Mouse
Entrez	10043	21968
Ensembl	ENSG00000100284	ENSMUSG00000042870
UniProt	O60784	O88746
RefSeq (mRNA)	NM_001135729; NM_001135730; NM_001135732; NM_005488	NM_001136259; NM_011622
RefSeq (protein)	NP_001129201; NP_001129202; NP_001129204; NP_005479	NP_001129731; NP_035752
Location (UCSC)	Chr 22: 35.3 – 35.35 Mb	Chr 8: 75.76 – 75.8 Mb
PubMed search
- Wikidata
View/Edit Human	View/Edit Mouse

Target of Myb protein 1 is a protein that in humans is encoded by the TOM1 gene.

The specific function of this gene has not yet been determined, yet it may involve the translocation of growth factor receptor complexes to the lysosome for degradation. This gene is localized to 22q13.1, with HMOX1 and MCM5 distally and HMG2L1 proximally positioned.

== Interactions ==
TOM1 has been shown to interact with TOLLIP and ZFYVE16.
