= IκBα =

Protein-coding gene in the species Homo sapiens

NFKBIA
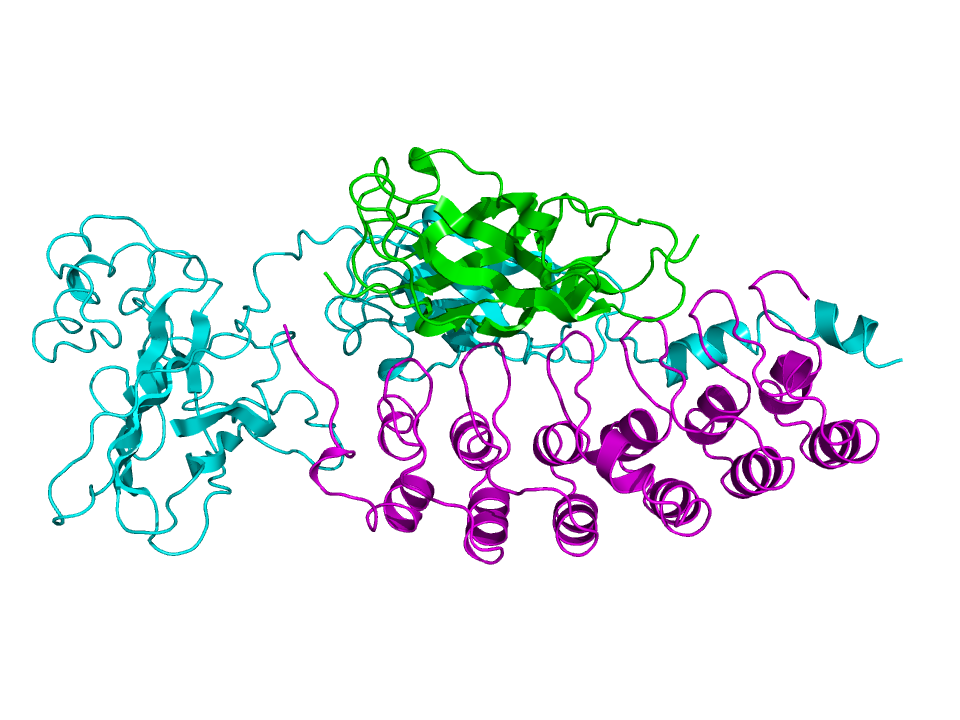

Identifiers
- Aliases: NFKBIA, IKBA, MAD-3, NFKBI, NFKB inhibitor alpha, EDAID2
- External IDs: OMIM: 164008; MGI: 104741; GeneCards: NFKBIA
Available structures
PDB	Ortholog search: PDBe RCSB
PDB	List of PDB id codes 1IKN, 1NFI

Gene location (Human)
Chr.	Chromosome 14 (human)
Band	14q13.2	Start	35,401,513 bp
Band	14q13.2	End	35,404,749 bp

Gene location (Mouse)
Chr.	Chromosome 12 (mouse)
Band	12|12 C1	Start	55,536,195 bp
Band	12|12 C1	End	55,539,432 bp
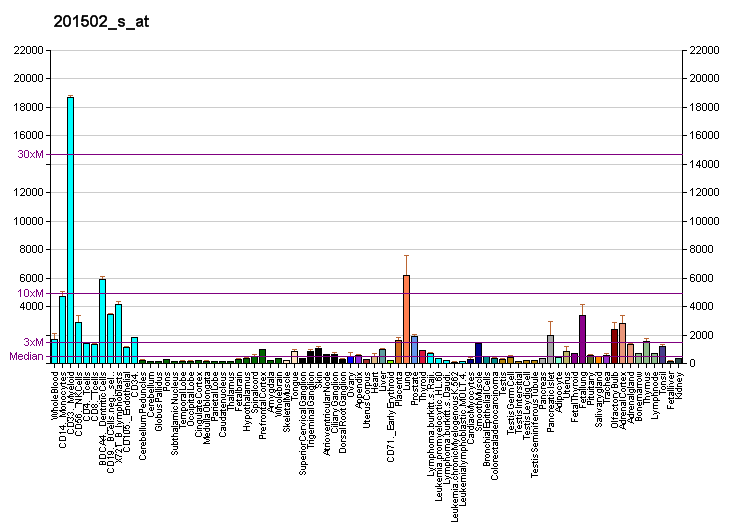
RNA expression pattern
Bgee	Human / Mouse (ortholog); Top expressed in: vena cava; pericardium; lower lobe of lung; oocyte; nipple; saphenous vein; mucosa of urinary bladder; beta cell; monocyte; upper lobe of lung / Top expressed in: carotid body; Paneth cell; mesenteric lymph nodes; ciliary body; vestibular membrane of cochlear duct; right lung lobe; left lung lobe; stroma of bone marrow; tibiofemoral joint; endothelial cell of lymphatic vessel; More reference expression data
BioGPS	More reference expression data
Gene ontology
Molecular function	transcription factor binding; protein binding; nuclear localization sequence binding; identical protein binding; enzyme binding; ubiquitin protein ligase binding; heat shock protein binding; protein-containing complex binding; NF-kappaB binding
Cellular component	cytoplasm; I-kappaB/NF-kappaB complex; plasma membrane; nucleus; cytosol; intracellular anatomical structure; protein-containing complex; nucleoplasm
Biological process	response to muscle stretch; positive regulation of protein metabolic process; response to exogenous dsRNA; cytoplasmic sequestering of transcription factor; negative regulation of DNA binding; cellular response to organic cyclic compound; cytoplasmic sequestering of NF-kappaB; response to muramyl dipeptide; negative regulation of apoptotic process; cellular response to cytokine stimulus; positive regulation of transcription, DNA-templated; response to lipopolysaccharide; cellular response to cold; regulation of cell population proliferation; positive regulation of cholesterol efflux; nucleotide-binding oligomerization domain containing 2 signaling pathway; regulation of gene expression; negative regulation of lipid storage; viral process; negative regulation of NF-kappaB transcription factor activity; negative regulation of myeloid cell differentiation; negative regulation of macrophage derived foam cell differentiation; nucleotide-binding oligomerization domain containing 1 signaling pathway; lipopolysaccharide-mediated signaling pathway; negative regulation of Notch signaling pathway; positive regulation of transcription by RNA polymerase II; apoptotic process; liver regeneration; toll-like receptor 4 signaling pathway; protein deubiquitination; I-kappaB kinase/NF-kappaB signaling; tumor necrosis factor-mediated signaling pathway; positive regulation of inflammatory response; cellular response to tumor necrosis factor; interleukin-1-mediated signaling pathway; regulation of NIK/NF-kappaB signaling; protein import into nucleus
Sources:Amigo / QuickGO
Orthologs
Databases	NCBI: entry; OMA: entry
Species	Human	Mouse
Entrez	4792	18035
Ensembl	ENSG00000100906	ENSMUSG00000021025
UniProt	P25963	Q9Z1E3
RefSeq (mRNA)	NM_020529	NM_010907
RefSeq (protein)	NP_065390	NP_035037
Location (UCSC)	Chr 14: 35.4 – 35.4 Mb	Chr 12: 55.54 – 55.54 Mb
PubMed search
- Wikidata
View/Edit Human	View/Edit Mouse

IκBα (nuclear factor of kappa light polypeptide gene enhancer in B-cells inhibitor alpha; NFKBIA) is one member of a family of cellular proteins that function to inhibit the NF-κB transcription factor. IκBα inhibits NF-κB by masking the nuclear localization signals (NLS) of NF-κB proteins and keeping them sequestered in an inactive state in the cytoplasm. In addition, IκBα blocks the ability of NF-κB transcription factors to bind to DNA, which is required for NF-κB's proper functioning.

== Disease linkage ==
The gene encoding the IκBα protein is mutated in some Hodgkin's lymphoma cells; such mutations inactivate the IκBα protein, thus causing NF-κB to be chronically active in the lymphoma tumor cells and this activity contributes to the malignant state of these tumor cells.

== Interactions ==
IκBα has been shown to interact with:

- BTRC,
- C22orf25,
- CHUK,
- DYNLL1,
- G3BP2,
- Heterogeneous nuclear ribonucleoprotein A1,
- IKK2,
- NFKB1,
- P53,
- RELA,
- RPS6KA1,
- SUMO4, and
- Valosin-containing protein.
