= GLS =

GLS may refer to:

== Science and technology ==
- GBAS landing system, an aircraft landing system
- GLS light bulb, a type of light bulb used for general lighting service
- Generalized least squares, in statistics
- Global location sensor
- Glutaminase, a type of enzyme often abbreviated GLS
- Glutaminase kidney isoform, specific enzyme encoded by the gene GLS
- Gray leaf spot, a fungal plant disease
- Guided local search, a search algorithm

== Organisations ==
- General Logistics Systems, a Dutch logistics company
- Genesis Lease (NYSE: GLS), a former Bermudan aircraft leasing company
- Government Legal Service, former name of a UK Government group
- University of Chicago Graduate Library School
- Glasgow Literary Society, Scotland
- Global Linguist Solutions, an American translation company
- GLS Bank, a German ethical bank
- GLS University, in Ahmedabad, India

== Events ==
- Games, Learning & Society Conference
- Georgetown Leadership Seminar
- Global Leaders' Summit

== Places ==
- Glaisdale railway station (Station code), in England
- Gloucestershire, England
- Scholes International Airport at Galveston (IATA and FAA LID codes), Texas, US

== Other uses ==
- Guy L. Steele Jr. (born 1954), American computer scientist
- Mercedes-Benz GLS, an automobile
