= Tumor M2-PK =

Tumor M2-PK is a synonym for the dimeric form of the pyruvate kinase isoenzyme type M2 (PKM2), a key enzyme within tumor metabolism. Tumor M2-PK can be elevated in many tumor types, rather than being an organ-specific tumor marker such as PSA. Increased stool (fecal) levels are being investigated as a method of screening for colorectal tumors, and EDTA plasma levels are undergoing testing for possible application in the follow-up of various cancers.

Sandwich ELISAs based on two monoclonal antibodies which specifically recognize Tumor M2-PK (the dimeric form of M2-PK) are available for the quantification of Tumor M2-PK in stool and EDTA-plasma samples respectively. As a biomarker, the amount of Tumor M2-PK in stool and EDTA-plasma reflects the specific metabolic status of the tumors.

== Early detection of colorectal tumors and polyps ==
M2-PK, as measured in feces, is a potential tumor marker for colorectal cancer. When measured in feces with a cutoff value of 4 U/ml, its sensitivity has been estimated to be 85% (with a 95% confidence interval of 65 to 96%) for colon cancer and 56% (confidence interval 41–74%) for rectal cancer. Its specificity is 95%.

The M2-PK test is not dependent on occult blood (ELISA method), so it can detect bleeding or non-bleeding bowel cancer and also polyps with high sensitivity and high specificity with no false negative, but false positives may occur.

Most people are more willing to accept non-invasive preventive medical check-ups. Therefore, the measurement of tumor M2-PK in stool samples, with follow-up by colonoscopy to clarify the tumor M2-PK positive results, may prove to be an advance in the early detection of colorectal carcinomas. The CE marked M2-PK Test is available in form of an ELISA test for quantitative results or as point of care test to receive results within minutes.

Tumor M2-PK is also useful to diagnose lung cancer and better than SCC and NSE tumor markers. With renal cell carcinoma (RCC), the M2PK test has sensitivity of 66.7 percent for metastatic RCC and 27.5 percent for nonmetastatic RCC, but M2PK test cannot detect transitional cell carcinoma of the bladder, prostate cancer and benign prostatic hyperplasia.

== Cancer follow-up ==
Studies from various international working groups have revealed a significantly increased amount of Tumor M2-PK in EDTA-plasma samples of patients with renal, lung, breast, cervical and gastrointestinal tumors (oesophagus, stomach, pancreas, colon, rectum), as well as melanoma, which correlated with the tumor stage.

The combination of Tumor M2-PK with the appropriate classical tumor marker, such as CEA for bowel cancer, CA 19-9 for pancreatic cancer and CA 72-4 for gastric cancer, significantly increases the sensitivity to detect various cancers.

An important application of the Tumor M2-PK test in EDTA-plasma is for follow-up during tumor therapy, to monitor the success or failure of the chosen treatment, as well as predicting the chances of a “cure” and survival.

If Tumor M2-PK levels decrease during therapy and then remain low after therapy it points towards successful treatment. An increase in the Tumor M2-PK values during or after therapy points towards relapse and/or metastasis.

Increased Tumor M2-PK values can sometimes also occur in severe inflammatory diseases, which must be excluded by differential diagnosis.

== Tetrameric and dimeric PKM2 ==
Pyruvate kinase catalyzes the last step within the glycolytic sequence, the dephosphorylation of phosphoenolpyruvate to pyruvate and is responsible for net energy production within the glycolytic pathway. Depending upon the different metabolic functions of the tissues, different isoenzymes of pyruvate kinase are expressed.

M2-PK (PKM2) is the predominant pyruvate kinase isoform in proliferating cells, such as fibroblasts, embryonic cells and adult stem cells and most human tissue, including lung, bladder, kidney and thymus; M2-PK is upgregulated in many human tumors.

M2-PK can occur in two different forms in proliferating cells:

- a tetrameric form, which consists of four subunits
- a dimeric form, consisting of two subunits.

The tetrameric form of M2-PK has a high affinity to its substrate, phosphoenolpyruvate (PEP), and is highly active at physiological PEP concentrations. Furthermore, the tetrameric form of M2-PK is associated with several other glycolytic enzymes within the so-called glycolytic enzyme complex. Due to the close proximity of the enzymes, the association within the glycolytic enzyme complex leads to a highly effective conversion of glucose to lactate. When M2-PK is mainly in the highly active tetrameric form, which is the case in most normal cells, glucose is mostly converted to lactate, with the attendant production of energy.

In contrast, the dimeric form of M2-PK has a low affinity for phosphoenolpyruvate, being nearly inactive at physiological PEP concentrations. When M2-PK is mainly in the dimeric form, which is the case in tumor cells, all phosphometabolites above pyruvate kinase accumulate and are channelled into synthetic processes which branch off from glycolytic intermediates, such as nucleic acids, phospholipids and amino acids, important cell building blocks for highly proliferating cells such as tumor cells.

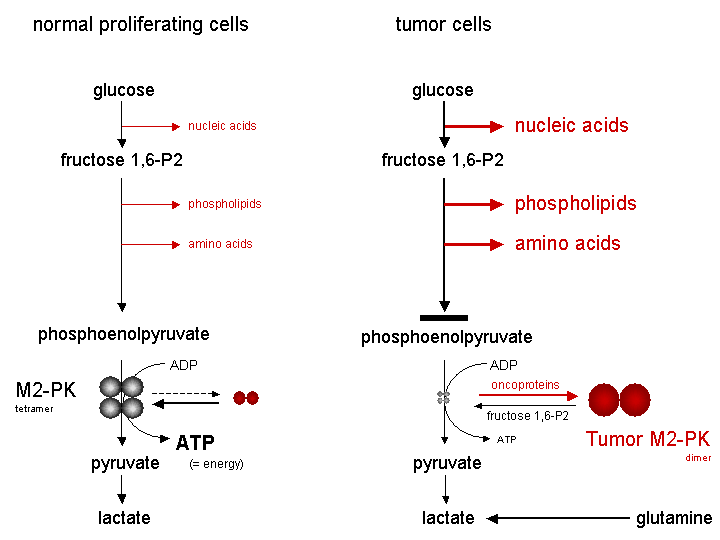
Metabolic consequences of the tetrameric and dimeric forms of M2-PK

As a consequence of the key position of pyruvate kinase within glycolysis, the tetramer : dimer ratio of M2-PK determines whether glucose carbons are converted to pyruvate and lactate, along with the production of energy (tetrameric form), or channelled into synthetic processes (dimeric form). In tumor cells M2-PK is mainly in the dimeric form. Therefore, the dimeric form of M2-PK has been termed Tumor M2-PK.

The dimerization of M2-PK in tumor cells is induced by the direct interaction of M2-PK with different oncoproteins.

However, the tetramer : dimer ratio of M2-PK is not constant.

Oxygen starvation or highly accumulated glycolytic intermediates, such as fructose 1,6-bisphosphate (fructose 1,6-P2) or the amino acid serine, induce the reassociation of the dimeric form of M2-PK to the tetrameric form. Consequently, due to the activation of M2-PK, glucose is converted to pyruvate and lactate under the production of energy until the fructose 1,6-P2 levels drop below a certain threshold value, which allows the dissociation of the tetrameric form of M2-PK to the dimeric form. Thereafter, the cycle of oscillation starts again when the fructose 1,6-P2 levels reach a certain upper threshold value which induces the tetramerization of M2-PK.

When M2-PK is mainly in the less active dimeric form, energy is produced by the degradation of the amino acid glutamine to aspartate, pyruvate and lactate, which is termed glutaminolysis.

In tumor cells the increased rate of lactate production in the presence of oxygen is termed the Warburg effect.

== Mutations ==
For the first time pyruvate kinase M2 enzyme was reported with two missense mutations, H391Y and K422R, found in cells from Bloom syndrome patients, prone to develop cancer. Results show that despite the presence of mutations in the inter-subunit contact domain, the K422R and H391Y mutant proteins maintained their homotetrameric structure, similar to the wild-type protein, but showed a loss of activity of 75 and 20%, respectively. H391Y showed a 6-fold increase in affinity for its substrate phosphoenolpyruvate and behaved like a non-allosteric protein with compromised cooperative binding. However, the affinity for phosphoenolpyruvate was lost significantly in K422R. Unlike K422R, H391Y showed enhanced thermal stability, stability over a range of pH values, a lesser effect of the allosteric inhibitor Phe, and resistance toward structural alteration upon binding of the activator (fructose 1,6-bisphosphate) and inhibitor (Phe). Both mutants showed a slight shift in the pH optimum from 7.4 to 7.0. The co-expression of homotetrameric wild type and mutant PKM2 in the cellular milieu resulting in the interaction between the two at the monomer level was substantiated further by in vitro experiments. The cross-monomer interaction significantly altered the oligomeric state of PKM2 by favoring dimerisation and heterotetramerization. In silico study provided an added support in showing that hetero-oligomerization was energetically favorable. The hetero-oligomeric populations of PKM2 showed altered activity and affinity, and their expression resulted in an increased growth rate of Escherichia coli as well as mammalian cells, along with an increased rate of polyploidy. These features are known to be essential to tumor progression.

== See also ==
- glycolysis
- tumor metabolome
- PKM2
