= M2-PK Test =

Screening for colorectal cancers and polyps

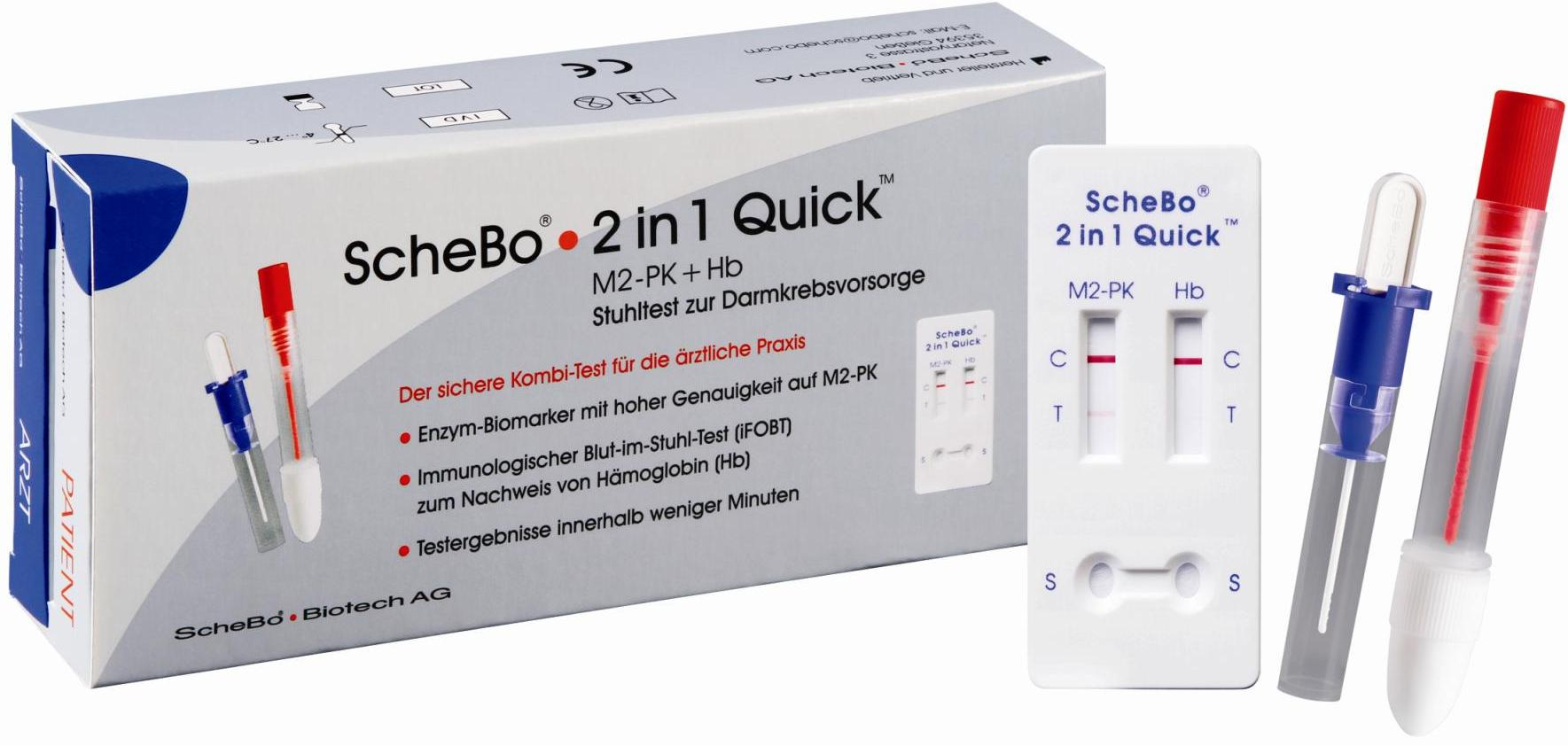
- M2-PK
- Purpose: for early detection of colorectal cancers

The M2-PK Test is a non-invasive screening method for the early detection of colorectal cancers and polyps which are known to be the precursors of colorectal cancer. The M2-PK Test which is used for stool analysis is available either as fully quantitative ELISA Test or as a rapid test that can be performed by any general practitioner without the need of a laboratory or any additional equipment.

The enzyme biomarker M2-PK has been identified as a key enzyme in colorectal cancers and polyps. The detection of M2-PK does not depend on blood in the stool and is specifically related on changes in the tumor metabolism. False positive results by unspecific blood sources in the bowel are excluded and the test is able to detect both bleeding as well as non-bleeding colorectal cancers and polyps. The M2-PK Test is able to detect 80.3% of colorectal cancers. Testing for M2-PK allows for colorectal cancer screening in asymptomatic patients. An elevated concentration of M2-PK in the stool should always be clarified by undergoing colonoscopy.

The gold standard of early detection of colon polyp/cancer is the invasive colonoscopy, but with high expense about $557, while tumor marker M2-PK Test expense only about $15-$25. The invasive colonoscopy makes acceptance of it low among patients, so relatively cheap non-invasive M2-PK Test is a good choice for detection early polyp/cancer.
