= Caytaxin =

Protein found in humans

ATCAY

Identifiers
- Aliases: ATCAY, BNIP-H, CLAC, ataxia, cerebellar, Cayman type, caytaxin, ATCAY kinesin light chain interacting caytaxin
- External IDs: OMIM: 608179; MGI: 2448730; GeneCards: ATCAY

Gene location (Human)
Chr.	Chromosome 19 (human)
Band	19p13.3	Start	3,879,864 bp
Band	19p13.3	End	3,928,082 bp

Gene location (Mouse)
Chr.	Chromosome 10 (mouse)
Band	10 C1|10 39.72 cM	Start	81,040,342 bp
Band	10 C1|10 39.72 cM	End	81,066,667 bp
RNA expression pattern
Bgee	Human / Mouse (ortholog); Top expressed in: middle temporal gyrus; Brodmann area 23; superior frontal gyrus; endothelial cell; entorhinal cortex; ganglionic eminence; postcentral gyrus; primary visual cortex; Brodmann area 46; dorsolateral prefrontal cortex / Top expressed in: superior frontal gyrus; visual cortex; dentate gyrus of hippocampal formation granule cell; primary visual cortex; thoracic ganglia; piriform cortex; cerebellar cortex; inferior colliculi; interventricular septum; lateral hypothalamus; More reference expression data
BioGPS	n/a
Gene ontology
Molecular function	protein binding; kinesin binding; WW domain binding; exopolyphosphatase activity
Cellular component	cytoplasm; neuron projection; axon; cell junction; dendrite; cell projection; synapse; mitochondrial membranes; mitochondrion; neuron projection terminus; perinuclear region of cytoplasm
Biological process	regulation of protein localization; neuron projection development; mitochondrion distribution; negative regulation of glutamate metabolic process; nervous system development; polyphosphate catabolic process; apoptotic process
Sources:Amigo / QuickGO
Orthologs
Databases	NCBI: entry; OMA: entry
Species	Human	Mouse
Entrez	85300	16467
Ensembl	ENSG00000167654	ENSMUSG00000034958
UniProt	Q86WG3	Q8BHE3
RefSeq (mRNA)	NM_033064	NM_178662
RefSeq (protein)	NP_149053	NP_848777
Location (UCSC)	Chr 19: 3.88 – 3.93 Mb	Chr 10: 81.04 – 81.07 Mb
PubMed search
- Wikidata
View/Edit Human	View/Edit Mouse

Caytaxin is a protein that in humans is encoded by the ATCAY gene. This protein is important for the development of the cerebellum's cortex, and the creation of synapses in cells like cerebellar granule cell and purkinje cells. Though the details are not fully understood, this may be accomplished either through the regulation of glutaminase, or by regulating the placement of mitochondria into the axons and dendrites.

== Medical Significance ==
Pathogenic mutations in the gene ATCAY are associated with a form of ataxia called Cayman ataxia (ATCAY). Symptoms include developmental delays, low muscle tone, and non-progressive ataxia. This autosomal recessive disorder was first discovered in the Grand Cayman Island, and was thought to be restricted to that location, but was later found in a family in Pakistan.
