= Glutamin-(asparagin-)ase =

Class of enzymes

Identifiers
- EC no.: 3.5.1.38
- CAS no.: 39335-03-0

Databases
- BRENDA: enzyme data
- ExPASy: NiceZyme view
- KEGG: enzyme entry
- MetaCyc: metabolic pathway
- Rhea: reactions
- PDB structures: RCSB PDB PDBe PDBsum
- Gene Ontology: AmiGO / QuickGO
Search
- PMC: articles
- PubMed: articles
- NCBI: proteins

Glutamin-(asparagin-)ase (EC 3.5.1.38) is an enzyme that catalyzes several related chemical reactions that hydrolyse amino acid amides to release ammonia and give the corresponding carboxylic acid. For example, L-glutamine is converted to L-glutamic acid and L-asparagine to L-aspartic acid:

glutamine
H_{2}O
NH_{3}
glutamic acid
asparagine
H_{2}O
NH_{3}
aspartic acid

The enzyme has been characterised from Achromobacteraceae and the reaction with asparagine proceeds at 0.8 of the rate with glutamine in that case. The D-isomers of the amino acids also react but at about one third of the rate. Related enzymes from Acinetobacter glutaminasificans, and Pseudomonas species are known.

Enzymes that act as asparaginases are used as anti-cancer agents and in that case the glutaminase ativity can lead to toxic side-effects. Hence there have been attempts to find more selective versions of these enzymes.

This enzyme is a hydrolase, one acting on carbon-nitrogen bonds other than peptide bonds, specifically in linear amides. The systematic name of this enzyme class is L-glutamine(L-asparagine) amidohydrolase.

== Structural studies ==
As of late 2007, 3 structures have been solved for this class of enzymes, with PDB accession codes PDB: 1DJO, PDB: 1DJP, and PDB: 4PGA.
