= C6H9N3O3 =

The molecular formula C_{6}H_{9}N_{3}O_{3} (molar mass: 171.15 g/mol, exact mass: 171.0644 u) may refer to:

- 6-Diazo-5-oxo-L-norleucine (DON)
- Metronidazole
