= 6-Diazo-5-oxo-L-norleucine =

Chemical compound

Legal status
- Legal status: not approved

Identifiers
- IUPAC name: (5S)-5-Amino-1-diazonio-6-hydroxy-6-oxohex-1-en-2-olate
- CAS Number: 157-03-9
- PubChem CID: 5359375
- ChemSpider: 16735775
- UNII: 03J0H273KZ
- ChEBI: CHEBI:138889
- ChEMBL: ChEMBL97485
- CompTox Dashboard (EPA): DTXSID501028846
- ECHA InfoCard: 100.150.017

Chemical and physical data
- Formula: C_{6}H_{9}N_{3}O_{3}
- Molar mass: 171.156 g·mol^{−1}
- 3D model (JSmol): Interactive image
- SMILES: O=C(CC[C@H](N)C(O)=O)\C=[N+]=[N-]
- InChI: InChI=1S/C6H9N3O3/c7-5(6(11)12)2-1-4(10)3-9-8/h3,5H,1-2,7H2,(H,11,12)/t5-/m0/s1; Key:YCWQAMGASJSUIP-YFKPBYRVSA-N

6-Diazo-5-oxo-L-norleucine (DON) is a glutaminase antagonist, which was isolated originally from Streptomyces in a sample of Peruvian soil. This diazo compound is biosynthesized from lysine by three enzymes in bacteria. It is a non-proteinogenic amino acid which was characterized in 1956 by Henry W Dion et al., who suggested a possible use in cancer therapy. This antitumoral efficacy was confirmed in different animal models. DON was tested as chemotherapeutic agent in different clinical studies, but was never approved, due to adverse side effects causing gastrointestinal toxicities.

In 2019, DON was shown to kill tumor cells while reversing disease symptoms and improve overall survival in late-stage experimental glioblastoma in mice, when combined with calorie-restricted ketogenic diet.

== History ==
In 1957, the first-in-human study of DON within 63 patients with advanced, inoperable, solid tumours was published by Magill et al. Multiple varieties of low doses (0.2-1.1 mg/kg daily), and differing administration routes (oral, intramuscular, intravascular) were used to test the pharmacokinetics of DON. The most common adverse side effects were mucositis (83%), diarrhea (48%), and nausea/vomiting (30%), with only 7/63 patients responding to treatment.

Multiple studies on a variety of cancers continued to take place between 1957 and 1962 on a variety of cancers and age groups, including 71 pediatric patients with acute leukemia. Complete remission was seen within 42% of leukiemia patients, when DON (daily dose of 0.25 mg/kg) was used in combination with a common leukiemia chemotherapy agent, 6-mercaptopurine (6-MP), which was better than 6-MP being used alone.

In the 1980s-2000s, DON therapy was given in higher doses (25-100mg/kg in mice every 4 days), which showed to be promising in nude mouse models that were transplanted with human tumours. Since higher doses more intermittently was well tolerated, and improved tumour regression, this regimen was employed within further clinical trials.

In the 1980s, five phase I dose escalation studies were carried out. DON was administered intravenously in doses ranging from 50 mg/m^{2}/dose to 600 mg/m^{2}/dose (1.35-16.2 mg/kg~), two to three times weekly, every three to four weeks. No responses to the therapy were seen within any adult group, and the pediatric patients displayed stable disease, or partial responses to treatment with DON. Some patients also experienced blood abnormalities (leukopenia/thrombocytopenia), but this was in patients with underlying metastases, or diseases involving the bone marrow.

Phase II Trials concluded that DON was ineffective at high doses, and too toxic, and was therefore abandoned. It showed mixed results within a variance of cancers, with 24 out of 44 patients with advanced colorectal cancer experiencing progression regardless of dosage, no responses seen in 41 patients with advanced sarcomas, or 23 patients with advanced lung cancers, and only 1 out of 17 patients with advanced refractory solid tumours showing a partial response.

Recent studies have shown that utilizing molecules to develop inactive forms of DON (known as prodrugs) until it reaches the site of a tumour, could be an effective anticancer therapy option. A focus is seen particularly on brain tumours (such as glioblastomas) as they tend to have an amplification of MYC or MYCN oncogenes, which promote glutamine catabolism and drive cancer cell survival, within an environment of increased energy demand.

The prodrug of DON, DRP-104, has shown significant promise against tumours, whilst remaining inactive within healthy gastrointestinal tissues, reducing its gastrointestinal toxicity. It has significantly better tolerance than DON, and has been shown to enhance the effects of a subset of T cells (CD8+, 'cytotoxic') that help kill tumour cells.

== Chemistry ==
DON is a water-soluble yellowish powder, which can be dissolved also in aqueous solutions of methanol, acetone or ethanol, but dissolution in absolute alcohols is difficult. Solutions of at least 50 μM DON in 0.9% NaCl are lightly yellowish. The crystalline form appears as yellowish greenish needles. The specific rotation is [α]_{26}^{D} +21° (c = 5.4% in H_{2}O). In phosphate buffer, pH 7 are the ultraviolet absorption maxima at 274 nm (E1%1 cm. 683) and 244 nm (E1%1 cm 376).

== Biochemistry ==
DON is used as an inhibitor of different glutamine-utilizing enzymes. Due to its similarity to glutamine, it can enter catalytic centres of these enzymes and inhibits them by covalent binding, or more precisely, by alkylation. The following table gives a survey of DON targets.

Selection of enzymes inhibited by DON
Enzyme	Metabolic pathway	References
Carbamoyl phosphate synthase (CAD)	Pyrimidine-De-Novo-Synthesis	
Cytidine triphosphate (CTP) synthase (CTPS)	Pyrimidine-De-Novo-Synthesis	
Formylglycinamide ribonucleotide amidotransferase (FGAR)	Purine-De-Novo-Synthesis	
Guanosine monophosphate synthetase (GMPS)	Purine-De-Novo-Synthesis	
PRPP amidotransferase	Purine-De-Novo-Synthesis	
Glutaminase (GLS1)	Glutamate Synthesis(Glutaminolysis) Tricarboxylic acid (TCA) Cycle	
NAD^{+} synthetase (NADSYN)	Coenzyme of the electron transport chain	
Asparagine synthetase (ASNS)	Amino Acid Synthesis	
Glutamine synthetase (GS)	Amino Acid Synthesis	
Glutamine:Fructose-6-phosphate amidotransferase (GFAT)	Hexosamine synthesis	

== Pharmacology ==
Glutaminase (GLS1) is overexpressed in various cancer cells, and is associated with poor prognosis, promotion of epithelial to mesenchymal transition (EMT), and drug resistance.

DON's primary target is GLS1, an enzyme involved in the conversion of glutamine to glutamate. DON undergoes a two-step process of inhibition which results in the irreversible binding to the target enzyme, and the subsequent inactivation. The first step of this process is the initial binding to the glutamine active site on the enzyme, which results in the formation of a reactive species, that alkylates a nucleophilic residue in the enzymes active site. This alkylation forms a covalent adduct, in which the enzyme becomes permanently inactive.

Glutamate is involved in the generation of intermediates within the TCA cycle as a carbon source, as well as maintaining cellular redox homeostasis. Cancer cells depend on further cellular proliferation, which makes inhibition of glutamine and glutamate desirable as a therapeutic.

DON is also inhibitor of many enzymes of nucleotide synthesis, resulting in cellular cytotoxicity, and cell death as a result.

== See also ==
- JHU-083, a prodrug of 6-diazo-5-oxo-L-norleucine
