= Causes of cancer =

Genetic changes leading to uncontrolled cell growth and tumor formation

Share of all cancer deaths by risk factor

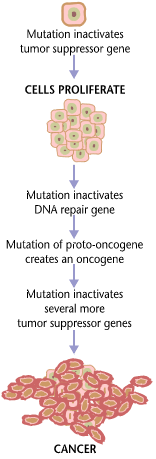
Cancer requires multiple mutations to progress.

Cancer is caused by genetic changes leading to uncontrolled cell growth and tumor formation. The basic cause of sporadic (non-familial) cancers is DNA damage and genomic instability. A minority of cancers are due to inherited genetic mutations. Most cancers are related to environmental, lifestyle, or behavioral exposures. Cancer is generally not contagious in humans, though it can be caused by oncoviruses and cancer bacteria. The term "environmental", as used by cancer researchers, refers to everything outside the body that interacts with humans. The environment is not limited to the biophysical environment (e.g. exposure to factors such as air pollution or sunlight), but also includes lifestyle and behavioral factors.

Over one third of cancer deaths worldwide (and about 75–80% in the United States) are potentially avoidable by reducing exposure to known factors. Common environmental factors that contribute to cancer death include exposure to different chemical and physical agents (tobacco use accounts for 25–30% of cancer deaths), environmental pollutants, diet and obesity (30–35%), infections (15–20%), and radiation (both ionizing and non-ionizing, up to 10%). These factors act, at least partly, by altering the function of genes within cells. Typically many such genetic changes are required before cancer develops. Aging has been repeatedly and consistently regarded as an important aspect to consider when evaluating the risk factors for the development of particular cancers. Many molecular and cellular changes involved in the development of cancer accumulate during the aging process and eventually manifest as cancer.

== Genetics ==
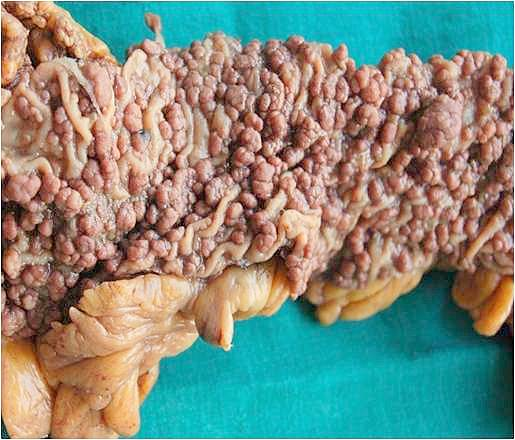
Multiple colon polyps within the colon of an individual with familial adenomatous polyposis

Although there are over 50 identifiable hereditary forms of cancer, less than 0.3% of the population are carriers of a cancer-related genetic mutation and these make up less than 3–10% of all cancer cases. The vast majority of cancers are non-hereditary ("sporadic cancers"). Hereditary cancers are primarily caused by an inherited genetic defect. A cancer syndrome or family cancer syndrome is a genetic disorder in which inherited genetic mutations in one or more genes predisposes the affected individuals to the development of cancers and may also cause the early onset of these cancers. Although cancer syndromes exhibit an increased risk of cancer, the risk varies. For some of these diseases, cancer is not the primary feature and is a rare consequence.

Many of the cancer syndrome cases are caused by mutations in tumor suppressor genes that regulate cell growth. Other common mutations alter the function of DNA repair genes, oncogenes and genes involved in the production of blood vessels. Certain inherited mutations in the genes BRCA1 and BRCA2 with a more than 75% risk of breast cancer and ovarian cancer. Some of the inherited genetic disorders that can cause colorectal cancer include familial adenomatous polyposis and hereditary non-polyposis colon cancer; however, these represent less than 5% of colon cancer cases. In many cases, genetic testing can be used to identify mutated genes or chromosomes that are passed through generations.

=== Cancer syndromes ===
- Ataxia–telangiectasia
- Bloom syndrome
- BRCA1 & BRCA2
- Fanconi anemia
- Familial adenomatous polyposis
- Hereditary breast and ovarian cancer
- Hereditary nonpolyposis colorectal cancer
- Li–Fraumeni syndrome
- Nevoid basal-cell carcinoma syndrome
- Von Hippel–Lindau disease
- Werner syndrome
- Xeroderma pigmentosum

== Physical and chemical agents ==
Particular substances, known as carcinogens, have been linked to specific types of cancer. Common examples of non-radioactive carcinogens are inhaled asbestos, certain dioxins, and tobacco smoke. Although the public generally associates carcinogenicity with synthetic chemicals, it is equally likely to arise in both natural and synthetic substances. It is estimated that approximately 20,000 cancer deaths and 40,000 new cases of cancer each year in the U.S. are attributable to occupation. Every year, at least 200,000 people die worldwide from cancer related to their workplace. Millions of workers run the risk of developing cancers such as lung cancer and mesothelioma from inhaling asbestos fibers and tobacco smoke, or leukemia from exposure to benzene at their workplaces. Cancer related to one's occupation is believed to represent between 2–20% of all cases. Most cancer deaths caused by occupational risk factors occur in the developed world. Job stress does not appear to be a significant factor at least in lung, colorectal, breast and prostate cancers. Participation in Operation Ranchhand in Vietnam during the Vietnam war, or living near a golf course, or living on a farm would increase the risk of non-Hodgkins lymphoma due to exposure to the chemical 2,4-D. When 2,4-D is mixed with another chemical pesticide or herbicide, 2,4-T, at a 50:50 ratio, they are collectively known as Agent Orange.

=== Air pollution ===
Share of lung cancer deaths attributed to air pollution

About 265,000 lung cancer deaths were attributed globally in 2019 to exposure to fine particulate matter (PM_{2.5}) suspended in the air. Exposure to indoor air pollution, including radon, caused another 170,000 lung cancer deaths. Lung cancer was also more common among people exposed to NO_{2} and black carbon.

Outdoor air pollution may increase risk of other types of cancer too, but the evidence is not as clear as for lung cancer. For example, there may be a relationship between kidney cancer and PM_{2.5} and NO_{2} levels. Household air pollution – from cooking with solid fuels, but also from radon in building material – has been associated with cervical, oral, and esophageal cancer.

=== Smoking ===
Share of cancer deaths attributed to tobacco

The incidence of lung cancer is highly related to smoking.

Tobacco smoking is associated with many forms of cancer, and causes 80% of lung cancer. Decades of research has demonstrated the link between tobacco use and cancer in the lung, larynx, head, neck, stomach, bladder, kidney, esophagus and pancreas. There is some evidence suggesting a small increased risk of developing myeloid leukemia, squamous cell sinonasal cancer, liver cancer, colorectal cancer, cancers of the gallbladder, the adrenal gland, the small intestine, and various childhood cancers. Seven toxicants in cigarette smoke have been identified that are most associated with respiratory tract carcinogenesis. The mechanism of action of two of them, acrylonitrile and acrolein, appears to involve oxidative stress and oxidative DNA damage. The other five toxicants, acetaldehyde, cadmium, ethylene oxide, formaldehyde and isoprene act through various mechanisms including direct interaction with DNA. Tobacco smoke contains over fifty known carcinogens, including nitrosamines and polycyclic aromatic hydrocarbons. Tobacco is responsible for about one in three of all cancer deaths in the developed world, and about one in five worldwide. Lung cancer death rates in the United States have mirrored smoking patterns, with increases in smoking followed by dramatic increases in lung cancer death rates and, more recently, decreases in smoking rates since the 1950s followed by decreases in lung cancer death rates in men since 1990. However, the numbers of smokers worldwide is still rising, leading to what some organizations have described as the tobacco epidemic.

Electronic cigarettes or e-cigarettes are handheld electronic devices that simulate the feeling of tobacco smoking. Daily long-term use of high voltage (5.0 V) electronic cigarettes may generate formaldehyde-forming chemicals at a greater level than smoking, which was determined to be a lifetime cancer risk of approximately 5 to 15 times greater than smoking. However, the overall safety and long-term health effects of electronic cigarettes is still uncertain.

=== Materials ===
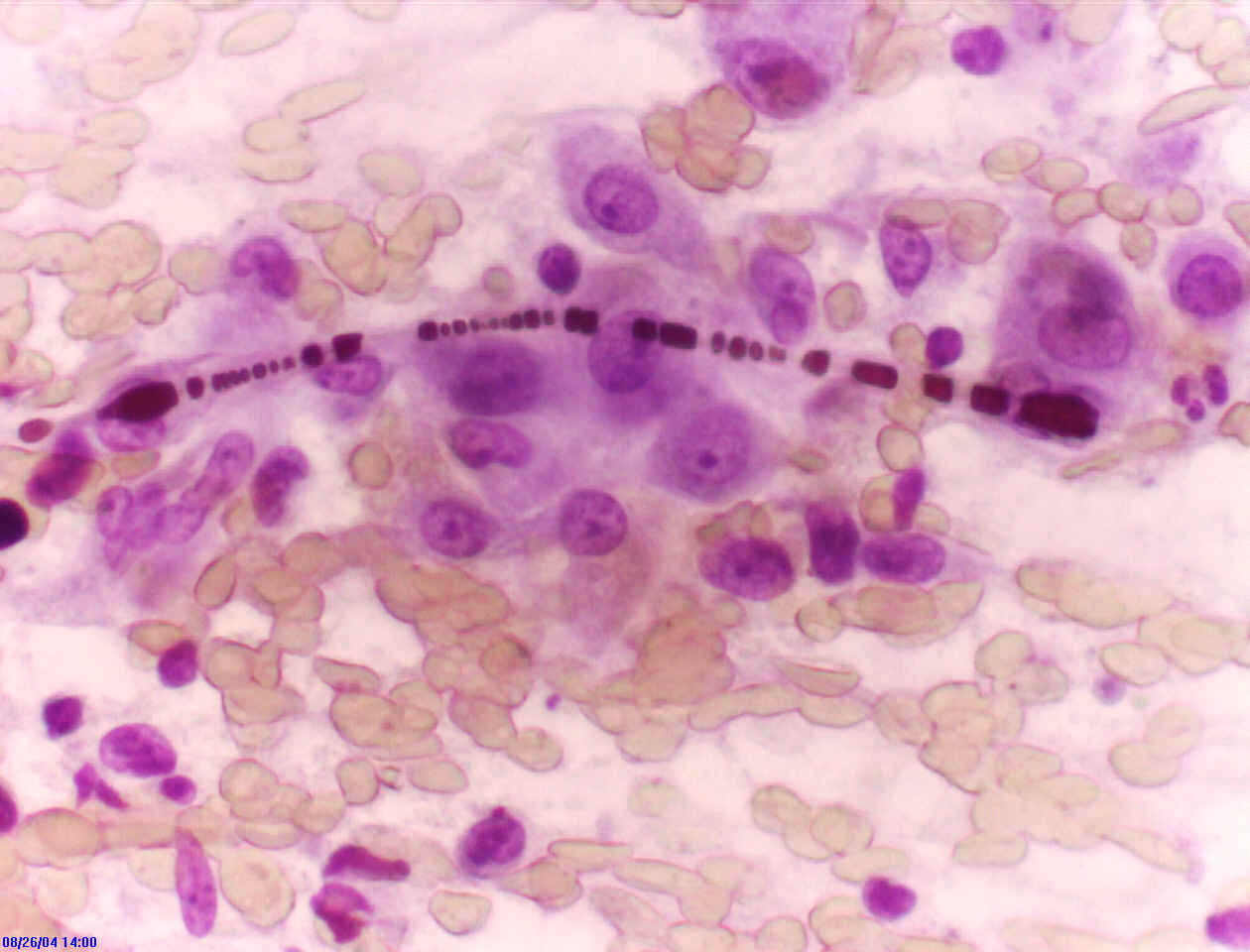
Asbestos body in a cytological slide

Some substances cause cancer primarily through their physical, rather than chemical, effects on cells. A prominent example of this is prolonged exposure to asbestos, naturally occurring mineral fibers which are a major cause of mesothelioma, which is a cancer of the serous membrane, usually the serous membrane surrounding the lungs. Other substances in this category, including both naturally occurring and synthetic asbestos-like fibers such as wollastonite, attapulgite, glass wool, and rock wool, are believed to have similar effects. Non-fibrous particulate materials that cause cancer include powdered metallic cobalt and nickel, and crystalline silica (quartz, cristobalite, and tridymite). Usually, physical carcinogens must get inside the body (such as through inhaling tiny pieces) and require years of exposure to develop cancer. Common occupational carcinogens include:

- arsenic
- asbestos
- benzene
- beryllium
- cadmium
- chromium
- ethylene oxide
- nickel
- Plutonium

== Lifestyle ==
Many different lifestyle factors contribute to increasing cancer risk. Together, diet and obesity are related to approximately 30–35% of cancer deaths. Dietary recommendations for cancer prevention typically include an emphasis on vegetables, fruit, whole grains, and fish, and avoidance of processed meat, red meat, animal fats, and refined carbohydrates. The evidence to support these dietary changes is not definitive.

=== Alcohol ===
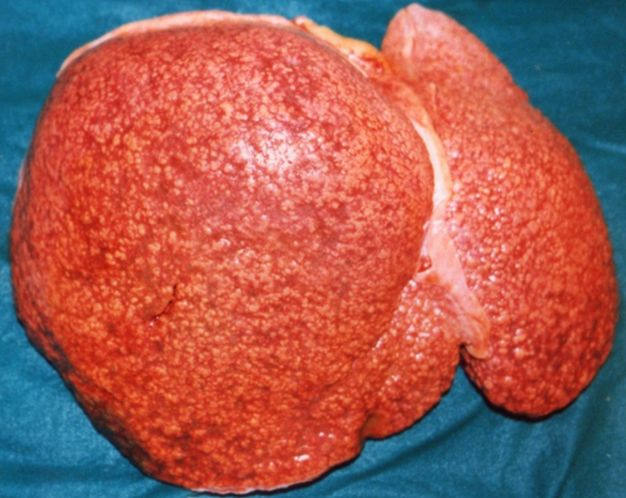
Chronic damage due to alcohol consumption can lead to liver cirrhosis (pictured above) and the development of hepatocellular carcinoma, a form of liver cancer.

Alcohol is an example of a chemical carcinogen. The World Health Organization has classified alcohol as a Group 1 carcinogen. In Western Europe 10% of cancers in males and 3% of cancers in females are attributed to alcohol. Worldwide, 3.6% of all cancer cases and 3.5% of cancer deaths are attributable to alcohol. In particular, alcohol use has been shown to increase the risk of developing cancers of the mouth, esophagus, pharynx, larynx, stomach, liver, ovaries, and colon. The main mechanism of cancer development involves increased exposure to acetaldehyde, a carcinogen and breakdown product of ethanol. Acetaldehyde induces DNA interstrand crosslinks, a form of DNA damage. These can be repaired by an inaccurate replication-coupled DNA repair pathway. This repair pathway results in increased mutation frequency and altered mutational spectrum. Other mechanisms have been proposed, including alcohol-related nutritional deficiencies, changes in DNA methylation, and induction of oxidative stress in tissues.

=== Diet ===
Some specific foods have been linked to specific cancers. Studies have shown that individuals that eat red or processed meat have a higher risk of developing breast cancer, prostate cancer, and pancreatic cancer. This may be partially explained by the presence of carcinogens in food cooked at high temperatures. Several risk factors for the development of colorectal cancer include high intake of fat, alcohol, red and processed meats, obesity, and lack of physical exercise. A high-salt diet is linked to gastric cancer. Aflatoxin B1, a frequent food contaminate, is associated with liver cancer. Betel nut chewing has been shown to cause oral cancers.

The relationship between diet and the development of particular cancers may partly explain differences in cancer incidence in different countries. For example, gastric cancer is more common in Japan due to the frequency of high-salt diets and colon cancer is more common in the United States due to the increased intake of processed and red meats. Immigrant communities tend to develop the cancer risk profile of their new country, often within one to two generations, suggesting a substantial link between diet and cancer.

When deoxycholate was added to the food of mice so that their feces contained deoxycholate at about the same level present in feces of human on a high fat diet, 45% to 56% of the mice developed colon cancer over the next 10 months, while none of the mice on a diet without deoxycholate developed cancer. A recent prospective human study investigating the relationship between microbial metabolites and cancer found a strong correlation between circulating deoxycholate as well as other specific bile acids and colorectal cancer risk in women.

==== Metabolic theory of cancer ====
The metabolic theory of cancer is the hypothesis that the primary cause of cancer is changes in cellular metabolism. The theory is strongly linked to the idea that diet can be used to prevent or treat many or most types of cancer. It is widely accepted that changes in cellular metabolism—specifically, an increased reliance on glucose for energy, and up-regulation of anabolic processes—do occur in many types of cancer cells. However, the idea that cancer can be controlled mostly or entirely by diet does not have broad acceptance in the medical field.

The metabolic theory of cancer is built upon several well-known biochemical differences between normal and rapidly-proliferating cells, including:

- Warburg effect: In the 1920s, Otto Warburg observed that cancer cells prefer to generate energy through anaerobic fermentation, even when oxygen is plentiful. This is different from normal cells, which use oxygen-dependent oxidative phosphorylation for more efficient energy production. As a result, cancer cells rely heavily on glucose (sugar) for energy, and produce significant amounts of lactate.
- Mitochondrial dysfunction: Proponents of the metabolic theory argue that mitochondrial dysfunction plays a crucial role in cancer. Mitochondria are the cell's energy factories and play a role in regulating cell death (apoptosis). Alterations in mitochondrial morphology are evident in most types of cancer cells.
- Metabolic flexibility and glutamine dependence: Cancer cells often rely on glutamine as an alternative energy source and as a building block for growth, especially when glucose is limited. This metabolic flexibility allows cancer cells to adapt and thrive under varying conditions, making them more resistant to standard treatments like chemotherapy.

Low-carbohydrate or ketogenic diets have been suggested as an adjunct to first-line cancer therapy. These diets greatly reduce levels of glucose in body fluids, thus starving cancer cells of their preferred energy source.

However, the metabolic theory is still under investigation and remains controversial. While there is evidence supporting the role of altered metabolism in cancer, many researchers are now examining cancer as a complex interplay of genetic mutations and metabolic dysregulation, rather than a purely genetic or purely metabolic disease.

=== Obesity ===
Cancers related to obesity
Men	Women
Colorectal cancer	Colorectal cancer
Esophageal adenocarcinoma	Endometrial cancer
Kidney cancer	Esophageal adenocarcinoma
Pancreatic cancer	Gallbladder cancer
Thyroid cancer	Kidney cancer
	Pancreatic cancer
	Post-menopausal breast cancer

In the United States, excess body weight is associated with the development of many types of cancer and is a factor in 14–20% of all cancer deaths. Every year, nearly 85,000 new cancer diagnoses in the United States are related to obesity. Individuals who underwent bariatric surgery for weight loss have reduced cancer incidence and mortality.

There is an association between obesity and colon cancer, post-menopausal breast cancer, endometrial cancer, kidney cancer, and esophageal cancer. Obesity has also been linked with the development of liver cancer. The current understanding regarding the mechanism of cancer development in obesity relates to abnormal levels of metabolic proteins (including insulin-like growth factors) and sex hormones (estrogens, androgens and progestogens). Adipose tissue also creates an inflammatory environment which may contribute to the development of cancers. Adipose tissue dysregulation can result in oxidative stress leading to oxidative DNA damage and cancer associated genetic instability.

Physical inactivity is believed to contribute to cancer risk not only through its effect on body weight but also through negative effects on immune system and endocrine system. More than half of the effect from diet is due to overnutrition rather than from eating too little healthy foods.

== Hormones ==
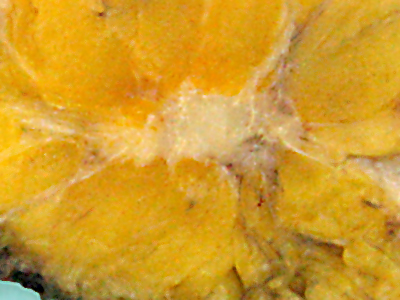
Macroscopic appearance of invasive ductal carcinoma of the breast. The tumor is the pale, crab-shaped mass at the center, surrounded by normal, yellow fatty tissue.

Some hormones play a role in the development of cancer by promoting cell proliferation. Insulin-like growth factors and their binding proteins play a key role in cancer cell growth, differentiation and apoptosis, suggesting possible involvement in carcinogenesis.

Hormones are important agents in sex-related cancers such as cancer of the breast, endometrium, prostate, ovary, and testis, and also of thyroid cancer and bone cancer. For example, the daughters of women who have breast cancer have significantly higher levels of estrogen and progesterone than the daughters of women without breast cancer. These higher hormone levels may explain why these women have higher risk of breast cancer, even in the absence of a breast-cancer gene. Similarly, men of African ancestry have significantly higher levels of testosterone than men of European ancestry, and have a correspondingly much higher level of prostate cancer. Men of Asian ancestry, with the lowest levels of testosterone-activating androstanediol glucuronide, have the lowest levels of prostate cancer.

Other factors are also relevant: obese people have higher levels of some hormones associated with cancer and a higher rate of those cancers. Women who take hormone replacement therapy have a higher risk of developing cancers associated with those hormones. On the other hand, people who exercise far more than average have lower levels of these hormones, and lower risk of cancer. Osteosarcoma may be promoted by growth hormones.

Some treatments and prevention approaches leverage this cause by artificially reducing hormone levels, and thus discouraging hormone-sensitive cancers. Because steroid hormones are powerful drivers of gene expression in certain cancer cells, changing the levels or activity of certain hormones can cause certain cancers to cease growing or even undergo cell death. Perhaps the most familiar example of hormonal therapy in oncology is the use of the selective estrogen-receptor modulator tamoxifen for the treatment of breast cancer. Another class of hormonal agents, aromatase inhibitors, now have an expanding role in the treatment of breast cancer.

== Infection and inflammation ==
Worldwide, approximately 18% of cancer cases are related to infectious diseases. This proportion varies in different regions of the world from a high of 25% in Africa to less than 10% in the developed world. Viruses are the usual infectious agents that cause cancer but bacteria and parasites also contribute. Infectious organisms that increase the risk of cancer are frequently a source of DNA damage or genomic instability.

=== Viruses ===
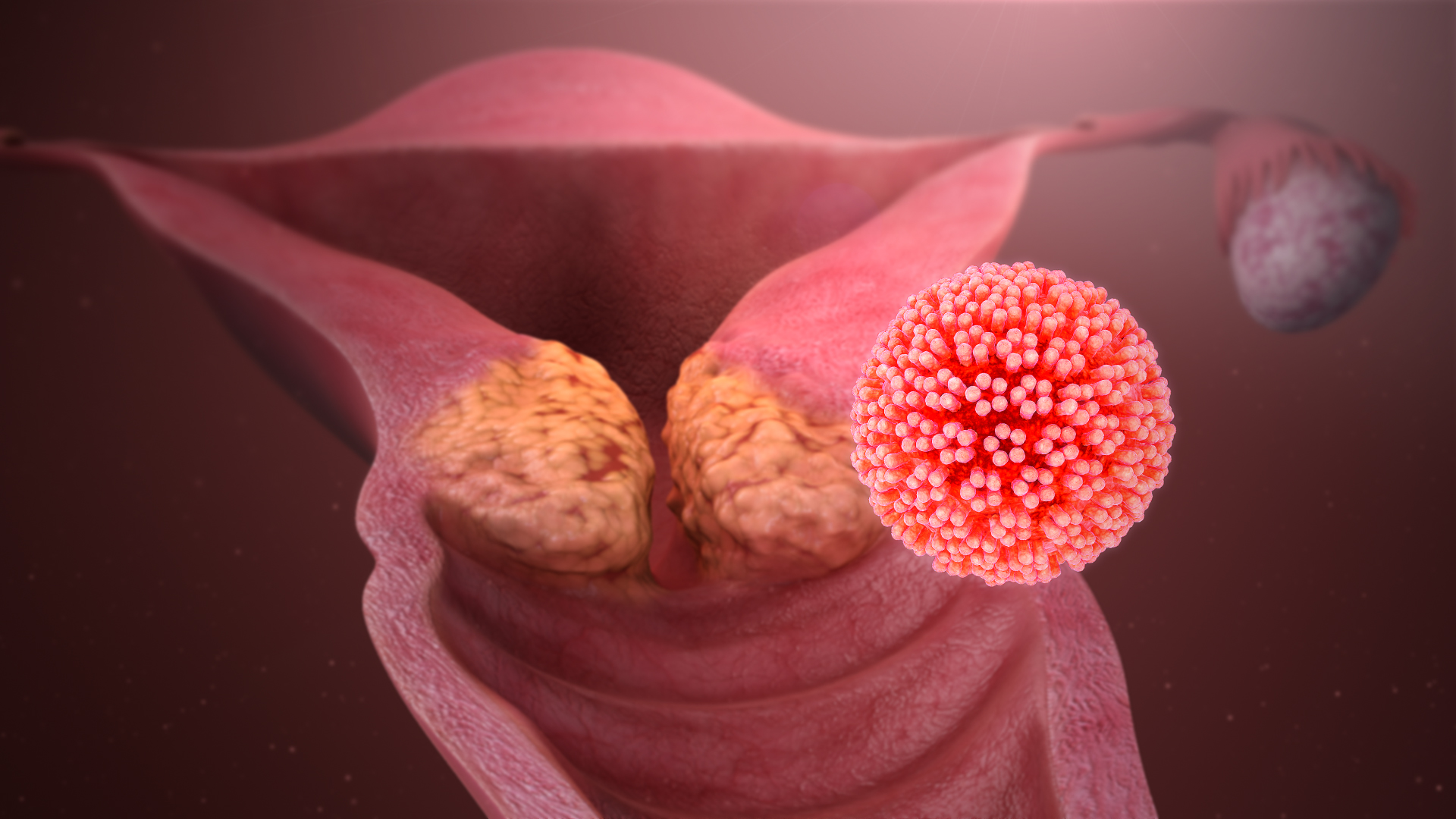
HPV is the most common virus that infects the reproductive tract. Infection can lead to the development of cervical cancer in women.

Viral infection is a major risk factor for cervical and liver cancer. A virus that can cause cancer is called an oncovirus. These include human papillomavirus (cervical carcinoma), Epstein–Barr virus (B-cell lymphoproliferative disease and nasopharyngeal carcinoma), Kaposi's sarcoma herpesvirus (Kaposi's sarcoma and primary effusion lymphomas), hepatitis B and hepatitis C viruses (hepatocellular carcinoma), and Human T-cell leukemia virus-1 (T-cell leukemias).

In Western developed countries, human papillomavirus (HPV), hepatitis B virus (HBV) and hepatitis C virus (HCV) are the most common oncoviruses. In the United States, HPV causes most cervical cancers, as well as some cancers of the vagina, vulva, penis, anus, rectum, throat, tongue and tonsils. Among high-risk HPV viruses, the HPV E6 and E7 oncoproteins inactivate tumor suppressor genes when infecting cells. In addition, the oncoproteins independently induce genomic instability in normal human cells, leading to an increased risk of cancer development. Individuals with chronic hepatitis B virus infection are more than 200 times more likely to develop liver cancer than uninfected individuals. Liver cirrhosis, whether from chronic viral hepatitis infection or excessive alcohol use, is independently associated with the development of liver cancer, but the combination of cirrhosis and viral hepatitis presents the highest risk of liver cancer development.

=== Bacteria and parasites ===
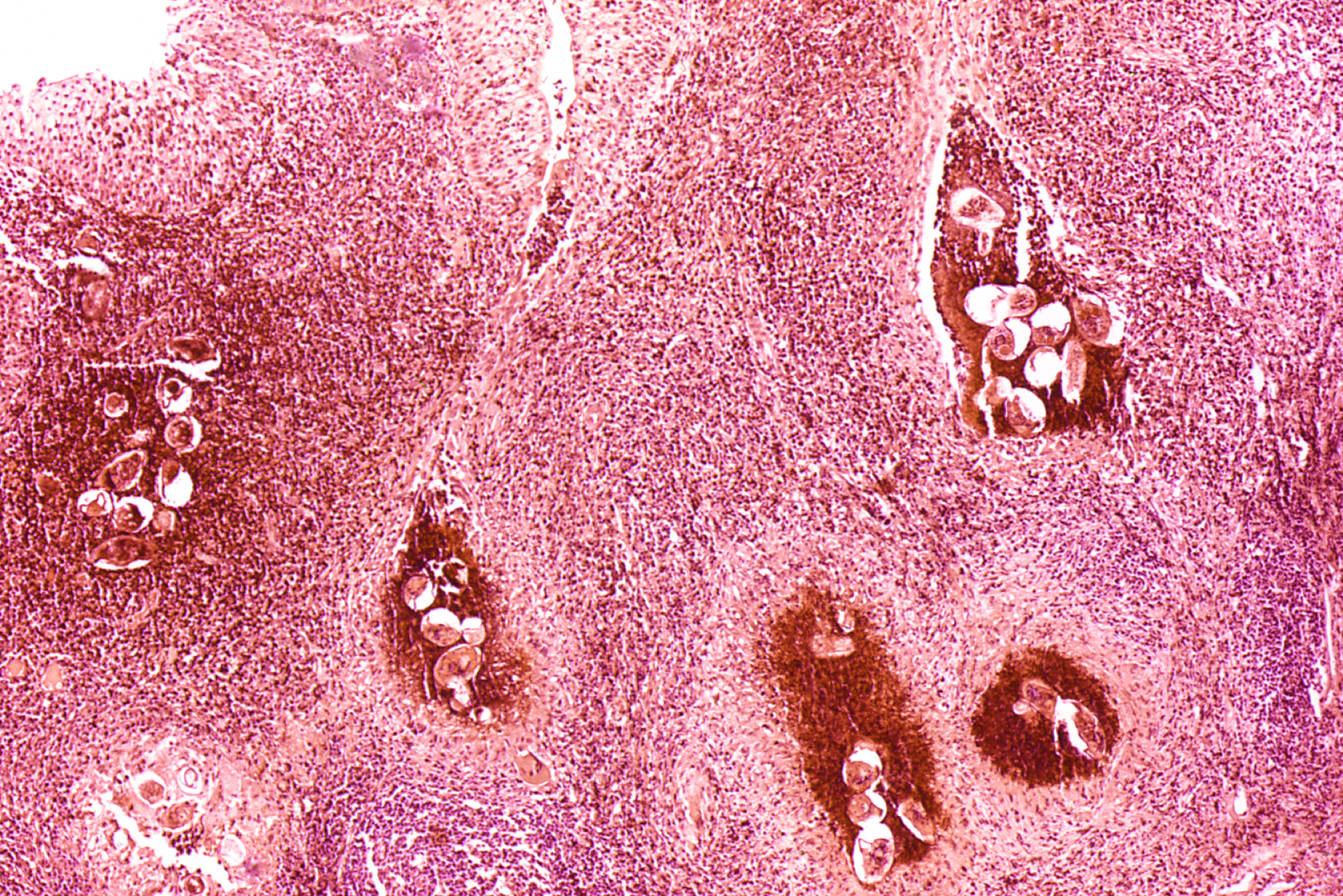
Histopathology of Schistosoma haematobium eggs within the lining of the bladder

Certain bacterial infections also increase the risk of cancer, as seen in Helicobacter pylori-induced gastric carcinoma. The mechanism by which H. pylori causes cancer may involve chronic inflammation or the direct action of some of the bacteria's virulence factors. Parasitic infections strongly associated with cancer include Schistosoma haematobium (squamous cell carcinoma of the bladder) and the liver flukes, Opisthorchis viverrini and Clonorchis sinensis (cholangiocarcinoma). Inflammation triggered by the worm's eggs appears to be the cancer-causing mechanism. Certain parasitic infections can also increase the presence of carcinogenic compounds in the body, leading to the development of cancers. Tuberculosis infection, caused by the mycobacterium M. tuberculosis, has also been linked with the development of lung cancer.

=== Inflammation ===
There is evidence that inflammation itself plays an important role in the development and progression of cancer. Chronic inflammation can lead to DNA damage over time and the accumulation of random genetic alterations in cancer cells. Inflammation can contribute to proliferation, survival, angiogenesis and migration of cancer cells by influencing tumor microenvironment. Individuals with inflammatory bowel disease are at increased risk of developing colorectal cancers.

== Radiation ==
Up to 10% of invasive cancers are related to radiation exposure, including both non-ionizing radiation and ionizing radiation. Unlike chemical or physical triggers for cancer, ionizing radiation hits molecules within cells randomly. If it happens to strike a chromosome, it can break the chromosome, result in an abnormal number of chromosomes, inactivate one or more genes in the part of the chromosome that it hit, delete parts of the DNA sequence, cause chromosome translocations, or cause other types of chromosome abnormalities. Major damage normally results in the cell dying, but smaller damage may leave a stable, partly functional cell that may be capable of proliferating and developing into cancer, especially if tumor suppressor genes were damaged by the radiation. Three independent stages appear to be involved in the creation of cancer with ionizing radiation: morphological changes to the cell, acquiring cellular immortality (losing normal, life-limiting cell regulatory processes), and adaptations that favor formation of a tumor. Even if the radiation particle does not strike the DNA directly, it triggers responses from cells that indirectly increase the likelihood of mutations.

=== Non-ionizing radiation ===
Squamous cell carcinoma on the sun-exposed skin of the nose

Not all types of electromagnetic radiation are carcinogenic. Low-energy waves on the electromagnetic spectrum including radio waves, microwaves, infrared radiation and visible light are thought not to be because they have insufficient energy to break chemical bonds. Non-ionizing radio frequency radiation from mobile phones, electric power transmission, and other similar sources have been described as a possible carcinogen by the World Health Organization's International Agency for Research on Cancer. However, studies have not found a consistent link between cell phone radiation and cancer risk.

Higher-energy radiation, including ultraviolet radiation (present in sunlight), x-rays, and gamma radiation, generally is carcinogenic, if received in sufficient doses. Prolonged exposure to ultraviolet radiation from the sun can lead to melanoma and other skin malignancies. The vast majority of non-invasive cancers are non-melanoma skin cancers caused by non-ionizing ultraviolet radiation. Clear evidence establishes ultraviolet radiation, especially the non-ionizing medium wave UVB, as the cause of most non-melanoma skin cancers, which are the most common forms of cancer in the world.

=== Ionizing radiation ===
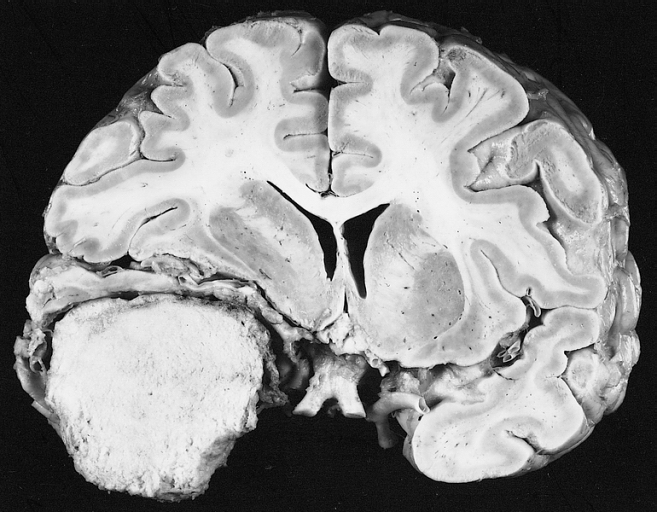
Cross section of a meningioma displacing the underlying brain

Sources of ionizing radiation include medical imaging, and radon gas. Ionizing radiation is not a particularly strong mutagen. Medical use of ionizing radiation is a growing source of radiation-induced cancers. Ionizing radiation may be used to treat other cancers, but this may, in some cases, induce a second form of cancer. Radiation can cause cancer in most parts of the body, in all animals, and at any age, although radiation-induced solid tumors usually take 10–15 years, and can take up to 40 years, to become clinically manifest, and radiation-induced leukemias typically require 2–10 years to appear. Radiation-induced meningiomas are an uncommon complication of cranial irradiation. Some people, such as those with nevoid basal cell carcinoma syndrome or retinoblastoma, are more susceptible than average to developing cancer from radiation exposure. Children and adolescents are twice as likely to develop radiation-induced leukemia as adults; radiation exposure before birth has ten times the effect.

Ionizing radiation is also used in some kinds of medical imaging. In industrialized countries, medical imaging contributes almost as much radiation dose to the public as natural background radiation. Nuclear medicine techniques involve the injection of radioactive pharmaceuticals directly into the bloodstream. Radiotherapy deliberately deliver high doses of radiation to tumors and surrounding tissues as a form of disease treatment. It is estimated that 0.4% of cancers in 2007 in the United States are due to CTs performed in the past and that this may increase to as high as 1.5–2% with rates of CT usage during this same time period.

Residential exposure to radon gas has similar cancer risks as passive smoking. Low-dose exposures, such as living near a nuclear power plant, are generally believed to have no or very little effect on cancer development. Radiation is a more potent source of cancer when it is combined with other cancer-causing agents, such as radon gas exposure plus smoking tobacco.

== Rare causes ==
=== Organ transplantation ===
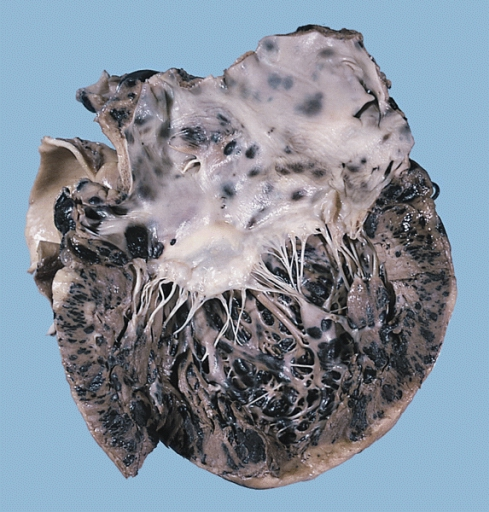
Melanoma metastases in a heart

The development of donor-derived tumors from organ transplants is exceedingly rare. The main cause of organ transplant associated tumors seems to be melanoma that was undetected at the time of organ harvest. There have also been reports of Kaposi's sarcoma occurring after transplantation due to tumorous outgrowth of virus-infected donor cells.

=== Trauma ===
Physical trauma resulting in cancer is relatively rare. Claims that breaking bones resulted in bone cancer, for example, have never been proven. Similarly, physical trauma is not accepted as a cause for cervical cancer, breast cancer, or brain cancer. One accepted source is frequent, long-term application of hot objects to the body. It is possible that repeated burns on the same part of the body, such as those produced by kanger and kairo heaters (charcoal hand warmers), may produce skin cancer, especially if carcinogenic chemicals are also present.

Frequently drinking scalding hot tea may produce esophageal cancer. Generally, it is believed that the cancer arises, or a pre-existing cancer is encouraged, during the process of repairing the trauma, rather than the cancer being caused directly by the trauma. However, repeated injuries to the same tissues might promote excessive cell proliferation, which could then increase the odds of a cancerous mutation.

=== Maternal-fetal transmission ===
In the United States, approximately 3,500 pregnant women have a malignancy annually, and transplacental transmission of acute leukemia, lymphoma, melanoma and carcinoma from mother to fetus has been observed. Excepting the rare transmissions that occur with pregnancies and only a marginal few organ donors, cancer is generally not a transmissible disease. The main reason for this is tissue graft rejection caused by MHC incompatibility. In humans and other vertebrates, the immune system uses MHC antigens to differentiate between "self" and "non-self" cells because these antigens are different from person to person. When non-self antigens are encountered, the immune system reacts against the appropriate cell. Such reactions may protect against tumor cell engraftment by eliminating implanted cells.

== See also ==
- Tumor metabolome
