= JHU-083 =

Experimental Drug

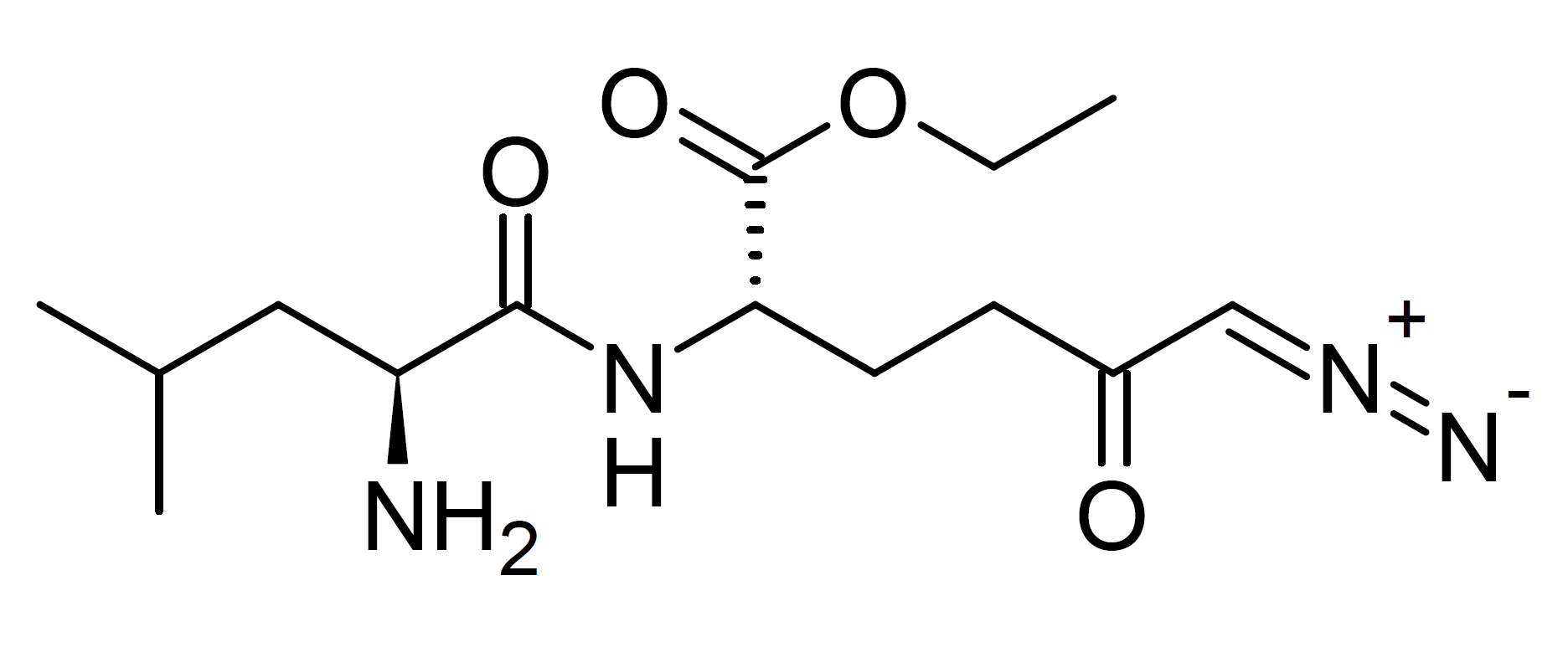

Identifiers
- IUPAC name: Ethyl (2S)-2-[[(2S)-2-amino-4-methylpentanoyl]amino]-6-diazo-5-oxohexanoate
- CAS Number: 1998725-11-3
- PubChem CID: 137283416
- ChemSpider: 76769879
- ChEBI: CHEBI:232049
- ChEMBL: ChEMBL3925599

Chemical and physical data
- Formula: C_{14}H_{24}N_{4}O_{4}
- Molar mass: 312.370 g·mol^{−1}
- 3D model (JSmol): Interactive image
- SMILES: CCOC(=O)[C@H](CCC(=O)C=[N+]=[N-])NC(=O)[C@H](CC(C)C)N
- InChI: InChI=1S/C14H24N4O4/c1-4-22-14(21)12(6-5-10(19)8-17-16)18-13(20)11(15)7-9(2)3/h8-9,11-12H,4-7,15H2,1-3H3,(H,18,20)/t11-,12-/m0/s1; Key:YZRCHOFKIPHQBW-RYUDHWBXSA-N

JHU-083 is an experimental drug which acts as a glutaminase inhibitor. It is a prodrug which is cleaved in vivo to the active form 6-diazo-5-oxo-L-norleucine. It has been researched for the treatment of various neurological conditions such as depression, Alzheimer's disease, and cerebral malaria, as well as multiple sclerosis, atherosclerosis, hepatitis, and some forms of cancer in which it was found to target senescent cells.
