= Glutaminase deficiency =

- Glutaminase deficiency is inherited via an autosomal recessive manner
- Causes: Mutation in GLS gene

Glutaminase deficiency is a rare genetic disorder that presents in childhood. It is associated with epilepsy and usually results in an early demise.

== Presentation ==
This condition is characterised by refractory seizures, respiratory failure, brain abnormalities and death in the neonatal period.

== Genetics ==
This condition is caused by mutations in the glutaminase (GLS) gene. The inheritance of this condition is autosomal recessive. Milder cases have been reported due a mutation in the 5' region of the gene.

== Diagnosis ==
This diagnosis is made by sequencing the GLS gene. There is presently no curative treatment. Management is supportive.

== Epidemiology ==
The prevalence is not known but this is considered to be a rare disease. As of 2019 only seven cases have been reported.

This condition was first described in 2018.
