= Glutaminase kidney isoform =

Enzyme found in humans

GLS

Identifiers
- Aliases: GLS, AAD20, GAC, GAM, GLS1, KGA, glutaminase, EIEE71, CASGID, GDPAG, DEE71, K-glutaminase
- External IDs: OMIM: 138280; MGI: 95752; GeneCards: GLS
Available structures
PDB	Ortholog search: PDBe RCSB
PDB	List of PDB id codes 3CZD, 3UNW, 3UO9, 3VOY, 3VOZ, 3VP0, 3VP1, 3VP2, 3VP3, 3VP4, 4O7D, 5D3O, 5FI6, 5FI7, 5FI2, 5I94
Enzyme activity
EC #	BRENDA	ExPASy	KEGG	MetaCyc
3.5.1.2	↗	↗	↗	↗

Gene location (Human)
Chr.	Chromosome 2 (human)
Band	2q32.2	Start	190,880,821 bp
Band	2q32.2	End	190,965,552 bp

Gene location (Mouse)
Chr.	Chromosome 1 (mouse)
Band	1 C1.1|1 26.86 cM	Start	52,202,607 bp
Band	1 C1.1|1 26.86 cM	End	52,272,391 bp
RNA expression pattern
Bgee	Human / Mouse (ortholog); Top expressed in: middle temporal gyrus; Brodmann area 23; pons; kidney tubule; Achilles tendon; lateral nuclear group of thalamus; renal medulla; glomerulus; metanephric glomerulus; postcentral gyrus / Top expressed in: pontine nuclei; neural layer of retina; medial dorsal nucleus; subiculum; hand; nucleus of stria terminalis; visual cortex; primary visual cortex; piriform cortex; primary motor cortex; More reference expression data
BioGPS	n/a
Gene ontology
Molecular function	protein binding; hydrolase activity; glutaminase activity
Cellular component	cytoplasm; cytosol; mitochondrial matrix; mitochondrion
Biological process	suckling behavior; glutamate biosynthetic process; cellular amino acid biosynthetic process; glutamine catabolic process; glutamate secretion; regulation of respiratory gaseous exchange by nervous system process; glutamine metabolic process; protein homotetramerization; chemical synaptic transmission
Sources:Amigo / QuickGO
Orthologs
Databases	NCBI: entry; OMA: entry
Species	Human	Mouse
Entrez	2744	14660
Ensembl	ENSG00000115419	ENSMUSG00000026103
UniProt	O94925	D3Z7P3
RefSeq (mRNA)	NM_001256310; NM_014905	NM_001081081; NM_001113383
RefSeq (protein)	NP_001243239; NP_055720	NP_001074550; NP_001106854
Location (UCSC)	Chr 2: 190.88 – 190.97 Mb	Chr 1: 52.2 – 52.27 Mb
PubMed search
- Wikidata
View/Edit Human	View/Edit Mouse

Glutaminase kidney isoform (sometimes ambiguously just called glutaminase) is an enzyme that in humans is encoded by the GLS gene. This protein is a type of glutaminase found in the mitochondria of kidney and brain cells. It is involved in both breaking down the amino acid glutamine in the kidneys, and regulating the levels of glutamate (a neurotransmitter and amino acid) in the brain.

== Transcripts ==
The gene GLS encodes three separate isoforms. Isoform 1 (or KGA) and isoform 3 (or Glutaminase C) are functional enzymes, while isoform 2 (or GAM) shows no enzyme activity. Isoform 1 is expressed in the brain and kidneys, while isoform 3 is mostly expressed in the brain, heart and pancreas. Neither isoform is expressed in the liver, distinguishing it from the glutaminase encoded by GLS2. Despite predictions that suggested that isoform 3 should undergo nonsense-mediated decay, it is highly expressed.

== Medical Significance ==
Pathogenic mutations in this gene have been associated with a number of diseases, including Developmental and epileptic encephalopathy 71 (DEE71), CASGID syndrome, and Global developmental delay, progressive ataxia, and elevated glutamine (GDPAG).
