= GLS2 =

Protein

Identifiers
- Aliases: GLS2, GA, GLS, LGA, hLGA, glutaminase 2
- External IDs: OMIM: 606365; MGI: 2143539; GeneCards: GLS2
Available structures
PDB	Ortholog search: PDBe RCSB
PDB	List of PDB id codes 4BQM
Enzyme activity
EC #	BRENDA	ExPASy	KEGG	MetaCyc
3.5.1.2	↗	↗	↗	↗

Gene location (Human)
Chr.	Chromosome 12 (human)
Band	12q13.3	Start	56,470,944 bp
Band	12q13.3	End	56,488,414 bp

Gene location (Mouse)
Chr.	Chromosome 10 (mouse)
Band	10|10 D3	Start	128,030,326 bp
Band	10|10 D3	End	128,045,873 bp
RNA expression pattern
Bgee	Human / Mouse (ortholog); Top expressed in: right lobe of liver; cerebellar hemisphere; right hemisphere of cerebellum; body of pancreas; right frontal lobe; oocyte; primary visual cortex; testicle; Brodmann area 9; middle temporal gyrus / Top expressed in: left lobe of liver; lumbar subsegment of spinal cord; visual cortex; cerebellar cortex; anterior horn of spinal cord; primary visual cortex; facial motor nucleus; superior frontal gyrus; embryo; neural layer of retina; More reference expression data
BioGPS	n/a
Gene ontology
Molecular function	hydrolase activity; protein binding; glutaminase activity
Cellular component	mitochondrial matrix; mitochondrion
Biological process	regulation of apoptotic process; glutamate secretion; cellular amino acid metabolic process; glutamine metabolic process; cellular amino acid biosynthetic process; glutamate biosynthetic process; glutamine catabolic process; reactive oxygen species metabolic process
Sources:Amigo / QuickGO
Orthologs
Databases	NCBI: entry; OMA: entry
Species	Human	Mouse
Entrez	27165	216456
Ensembl	ENSG00000135423	ENSMUSG00000044005
UniProt	Q9UI32	Q571F8
RefSeq (mRNA)	NM_001280796; NM_001280797; NM_001280798; NM_013267; NM_138566	NM_001033264; NM_001285777; NM_001285779
RefSeq (protein)	NP_001267725; NP_001267726; NP_001267727; NP_037399	NP_001028436; NP_001272706; NP_001272708
Location (UCSC)	Chr 12: 56.47 – 56.49 Mb	Chr 10: 128.03 – 128.05 Mb
PubMed search
- Wikidata
View/Edit Human	View/Edit Mouse

Glutaminase 2 (liver, mitochondrial) is a protein that in humans is encoded by the GLS2 gene.

== Structure ==
The GLS2 gene is on the 12th chromosome in humans, with its specific location being 12q13.3. It contains 19 exons.

== Function ==
GLS2 is a part of the glutaminase family. The protein encoded by this gene is a mitochondrial phosphate-activated glutaminase that catalyzes the hydrolysis of glutamine to stoichiometric amounts of glutamate and ammonia. Originally thought to be liver-specific, this protein has been found in other tissues as well. Alternative splicing results in multiple transcript variants that encode different isoforms.

== Clinical significance ==
GLS2 has interesting molecular relationships with tumor progression and cancer. Glutaminase 2 negatively regulates the PI3K/AKT signaling and shows tumor suppression activity in human hepatocellular carcinoma. Additionally, silencing of GLS and overexpression of GLS2 genes cooperate in decreasing the proliferation and viability of glioblastoma cells.
