= Pyruvate kinase PKM =

Protein-coding gene in humans

PKM
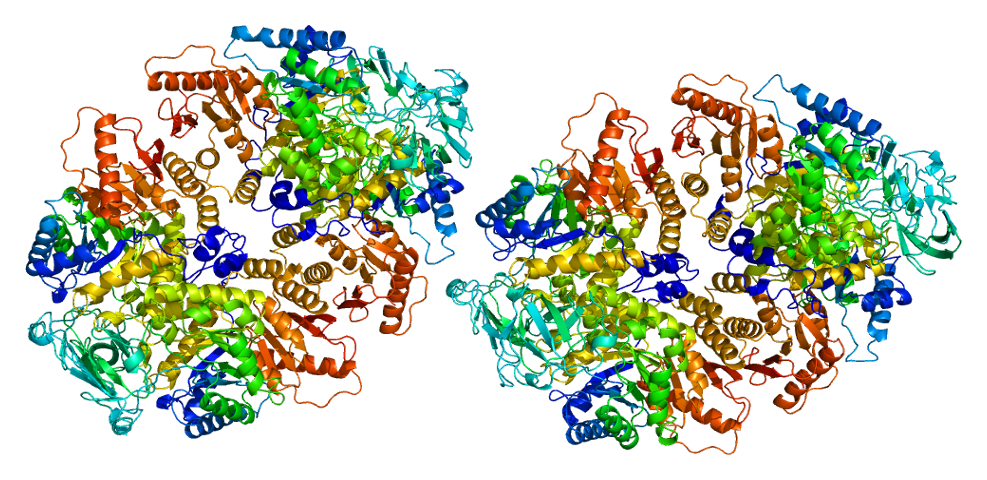

Identifiers
- Aliases: PKM, CTHBP, HEL-S-30, OIP3, PK3, PKM2, TCB, THBP1, pyruvate kinase, muscle, pyruvate kinase M1/2, p58
- External IDs: OMIM: 179050; MGI: 97591; GeneCards: PKM
Available structures
PDB	Ortholog search: PDBe RCSB
PDB	List of PDB id codes 1T5A, 1ZJH, 3BJF, 3BJT, 3G2G, 3GQY, 3GR4, 3H6O, 3ME3, 3SRD, 3SRF, 3SRH, 3U2Z, 4B2D, 4FXF, 4FXJ, 4G1N, 4JPG, 4QG6, 4QG8, 4QG9, 4QGC, 4RPP, 4WJ8, 4YJ5
Enzyme activity
EC #	BRENDA	ExPASy	KEGG	MetaCyc
2.7.1.40	↗	↗	↗	↗
2.7.10.2	↗	↗	↗	↗
2.7.11.1	↗	↗	↗	↗

Gene location (Human)
Chr.	Chromosome 15 (human)
Band	15q23	Start	72,199,029 bp
Band	15q23	End	72,231,819 bp

Gene location (Mouse)
Chr.	Chromosome 9 (mouse)
Band	9 B|9 32.03 cM	Start	59,656,368 bp
Band	9 B|9 32.03 cM	End	59,679,375 bp
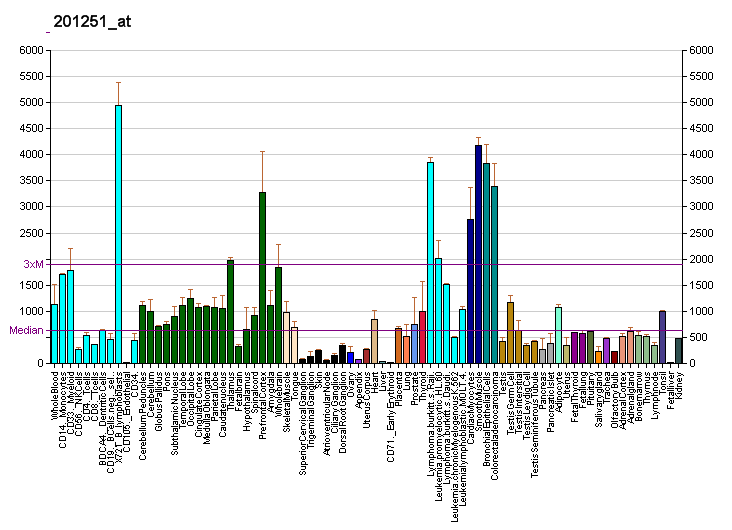
RNA expression pattern
Bgee	Human / Mouse (ortholog); Top expressed in: right hemisphere of cerebellum; right frontal lobe; prefrontal cortex; muscle of thigh; Skeletal muscle tissue of rectus abdominis; islet of Langerhans; right adrenal cortex; gastrocnemius muscle; left adrenal gland; stromal cell of endometrium / Top expressed in: neural layer of retina; dentate gyrus of hippocampal formation granule cell; muscle of thigh; epiblast; granulocyte; triceps brachii muscle; primary visual cortex; superior frontal gyrus; skeletal muscle tissue; cerebellar cortex; More reference expression data
BioGPS	More reference expression data
Gene ontology
Molecular function	transferase activity; nucleotide binding; potassium ion binding; metal ion binding; kinase activity; catalytic activity; protein binding; MHC class II protein complex binding; ATP binding; magnesium ion binding; pyruvate kinase activity; RNA binding; cadherin binding; identical protein binding; ADP binding; thyroid hormone binding
Cellular component	cytoplasm; extracellular vesicle; vesicle; extracellular matrix; myelin sheath; cilium; mitochondrion; extracellular exosome; nucleus; extracellular region; cytosol; secretory granule lumen; ficolin-1-rich granule lumen; pyruvate kinase complex; collagen-containing extracellular matrix
Biological process	glycolytic process; programmed cell death; phosphorylation; canonical glycolysis; metabolism; cellular response to insulin stimulus; neutrophil degranulation; response to hypoxia; liver development; glucose metabolic process; ATP biosynthetic process; response to nutrient; response to gravity; response to organic substance; response to muscle inactivity; animal organ regeneration; response to insulin; pyruvate biosynthetic process; skeletal muscle tissue regeneration; protein homotetramerization; positive regulation of sprouting angiogenesis
Sources:Amigo / QuickGO
Orthologs
Databases	NCBI: entry; OMA: entry
Species	Human	Mouse
Entrez	5315	18746
Ensembl	ENSG00000067225	ENSMUSG00000032294
UniProt	P14618	P52480
RefSeq (mRNA)	NM_001206796; NM_001206797; NM_001206798; NM_001206799; NM_002654 NM_182470; NM_182471; NM_001316318	NM_001253883; NM_011099
RefSeq (protein)	NP_001193725; NP_001193726; NP_001193727; NP_001193728; NP_001303247 NP_002645; NP_872270; NP_872271	NP_001240812; NP_035229; NP_001365795; NP_001365796; NP_001365797 NP_001365798; NP_001365799; NP_001365800; NP_001365801; NP_001392420
Location (UCSC)	Chr 15: 72.2 – 72.23 Mb	Chr 9: 59.66 – 59.68 Mb
PubMed search
- Wikidata
View/Edit Human	View/Edit Mouse

Pyruvate kinase isozymes M1/M2 (PKM1/M2), also known as pyruvate kinase muscle isozyme (PKM), pyruvate kinase type K, cytosolic thyroid hormone-binding protein (CTHBP), thyroid hormone-binding protein 1 (THBP1), or opa-interacting protein 3 (OIP3), is an enzyme that in humans is encoded by the PKM2 gene.

PKM2 is an isoenzyme of the glycolytic enzyme pyruvate kinase. Depending upon the different metabolic functions of the tissues, different isoenzymes of pyruvate kinase are expressed. PKM2 is expressed in some differentiated tissues, such as lung, fat tissue, retina, and pancreatic islets, as well as in all cells with a high rate of nucleic acid synthesis, such as normal proliferating cells, embryonic cells, and especially tumor cells.

== Discovery ==
The discovery of PKM2 began with laboratory observations made by Otto Heinrich Warburg, a German physiologist and Nobel Laureate in Physiology or Medicine in 1931. Warburg's experiments show that the cells exhibit dependence on glucose and are capable of fermentation, even under aerobic conditions. These observations are known as the Warburg effect. Subsequent research on the metabolic demands of cancer cells, studies have been directed towards the investigation of specific subtypes of pyruvate kinase, notably M1 and M2.

== Structure ==
Two isozymes are encoded by the PKM gene: PKM1 and PKM2. The M-gene consists of 12 exons and 11 introns. PKM1 and PKM2 are different splicing products of the M-gene (exon 9 for PKM1 and exon 10 for PKM2) and solely differ in 23 amino acids within a 56-amino acid stretch (aa 378–434) at their carboxy terminus.

== Function ==
Pyruvate kinase catalyzes the last step within glycolysis, the dephosphorylation of phosphoenolpyruvate to pyruvate, and is responsible for net ATP production within the glycolytic sequence. In contrast to mitochondrial respiration, energy regeneration by pyruvate kinase is independent from oxygen supply and allows survival of the organs under hypoxic conditions often found in solid tumors.

The involvement of this enzyme in a variety of pathways, protein–protein interactions, and nuclear transport suggests its potential to perform multiple nonglycolytic functions with diverse implications, although multidimensional role of this protein is as yet not fully explored. However, a functional role in angiogenesis the so-called process of blood vessel formation by interaction and regulation of Jmjd8 has been shown.

== Localization ==
=== Tissue ===
The PKM1 isozyme is expressed in organs that are strongly dependent upon a high rate of energy regeneration, such as muscle and brain.

=== Cellular ===
PKM2 is enzyme pyruvate kinase M2 (PKM2) and a transcriptional coactivator of STAT1 responsible for the induction of the protein PD-L1 expression and its regulation in tumor and immune cells. In the lactate production, the upregulated PKM2 is required and it leads to its contribution in inflammatory response, organ injury and septic death As a consequence, the removal of PKM2 in myeloid cells, administration of anti-PD-L1 or supplementation with recombinant interleukin -1 (IL-7) eases the microbial clearance, inhibits T cell apoptosis, reduce multiple organ dysfunction and reduce septic death in Bmal1-deficient mice.

=== Subcellular ===
PKM2 is a cytosolic enzyme that is associated with other glycolytic enzymes, i.e., hexokinase, glyceraldehyde 3-P dehydrogenase, phosphoglycerate kinase, phosphoglyceromutase, enolase, and lactate dehydrogenase within a so-called glycolytic enzyme complex.

However, PKM2 contains an inducible nuclear localization signal in its C-terminal domain. The role of PKM2 within the nucleus is complex, since pro-proliferative but also pro-apoptotic stimuli have been described. On the one hand, nuclear PKM2 was found to participate in the phosphorylation of histone 1 by direct phosphate transfer from PEP to histone 1. On the other hand, nuclear translocation of PKM2 induced by a somatostatin analogue, H_{2}O_{2}, or UV light has been linked with caspase-independent programmed cell death.

== Clinical significance ==
=== Bi-functional role within tumors ===
PKM2 is expressed in most human tumors. Initially, a switch from PKM1 to PKM2 expression during tumorigenesis was discussed. These conclusions, however, were the result of misinterpretation of western blots that had used PKM1-expressing mouse muscle as the sole non-cancer tissue. In clinical cancer samples, solely an up-regulation of PKM2, but no cancer specificity, could be confirmed.

In contrast to the closely homologous PKM1, which always occurs in a highly active tetrameric form and which is not allosterically regulated, PKM2 may occur in a tetrameric form but also in a dimeric form. The tetrameric form of PKM2 has a high affinity to its substrate phosphoenolpyruvate (PEP), and is highly active at physiological PEP concentrations. When PKM2 is mainly in the highly active tetrameric form, which is the case in differentiated tissues and most normal proliferating cells, glucose is converted to pyruvate under the production of energy. Meanwhile, the dimeric form of PKM2 is characterized by a low affinity to its substrate PEP and is nearly inactive at physiological PEP concentrations. Dimeric PKM2 produces little to no ATP in the conversion of PEP to pyruvate, making the net yield of ATP zero for glycolysis. When PKM2 is mainly in the less active dimeric form, which is the case in tumor cells, all glycolytic intermediates above pyruvate kinase accumulate and are channelled into synthetic processes, which branch off from glycolytic intermediates such as nucleic acid-, phospholipid-, and amino acid synthesis. Nucleic acids, phospholipids, and amino acids are important cell building-blocks, which are greatly needed by highly proliferating cells, such as tumor cells.

Due to the key position of pyruvate kinase within glycolysis, the tetramer:dimer ratio of PKM2 determines whether glucose carbons are converted to pyruvate and lactate under the production of energy (tetrameric form) or channelled into synthetic processes (dimeric form). However, even if PKM2 activity is low leading to the diversion of upstream intermediates to synthetic processes, pyruvate and lactate will still be made using carbon atoms from glucose and other metabolites through 86 pathways bypassing pyruvate kinase. These pyruvate kinase bypassing pathways are different from those participating in gluconeogenesis. Interestingly, many of the pyruvate kinase bypassing pathways use metabolites that transit through mitochondria, highlighting the importance of mitochondria in cancer metabolism irrespective of oxidative phosphorylation.

In tumor cells, PKM2 is mainly in the dimeric form and has, therefore, been termed Tumor M2-PK. The quantification of Tumor M2-PK in plasma and stool is a tool for early detection of tumors and follow-up studies during therapy. The dimerization of PKM2 in tumor cells is induced by direct interaction of PKM2 with different oncoproteins (pp60v-src, HPV-16 E7, and A-Raf). The physiological function of the interaction between PKM2 and HERC1 as well as between PKM2 and PKCdelta is unknown). Due to the essential role of PKM2 in aerobic glycolysis (The Warburg effect) which is a dominant metabolic pathway used by cancer cells. Its overcome in this pathway in macrophages may lead to better outcome in experimental sepsis. Thus, PKM2 is a regulator of LPS- and tumor-induced PD-L1 expression on macrophages and dendritic cells as well as tumor cells.

Studies involving the use of PKM2 activators have looked at promoting the conversion of dimeric PKM2 to its tetrameric form, hindering the growth of cancer cells. Furthermore, concurrent research is centered on targeting the tetrameric form of PKM2 with small-molecule activators, such as TEPP-46 and DASA-58, to increase its resistance to inhibition.

However, the tetramer:dimer ratio of PKM2 is not stationary value. High levels of the glycolytic intermediate fructose 1,6-bisphosphate induce the re-association of the dimeric form of PKM2 to the tetrameric form. As a consequence, glucose is converted to pyruvate and lactate with the production of energy until fructose 1,6-bisphosphate levels drop below a critical value to allow dissociation to the dimeric form. This regulation is termed metabolic budget system. Another activator of PKM2 is the amino acid serine. The thyroid hormone 3,3´,5-triiodi-L-thyronine (T3) binds to the monomeric form of PKM2 and prevents its association to the tetrameric form.

In tumor cells, the increased rate of lactate production in the presence of oxygen is termed the Warburg effect. Genetic manipulation of cancer cells so that they produce adult PKM1 instead of PKM2 reverses the Warburg effect and reduces the growth rate of these modified cancer cells. Accordingly, cotransfection of NIH 3T3 cells with gag-A-Raf and a kinase dead mutant of PKM2 reduced colony whereas cotransfection with gag-A-Raf and wild type PKM2 led to a doubling of focus formation.

The dimeric form of PKM2 has been observed to have protein kinase activity in tumor cells. It is able to bind to and phosphorylate the histone H3 of chromatin in cancer cells, thereby having a role in the regulation of gene expression. This modification of histone H3 and the resulting involvement in gene expression regulation can be a cause of tumor cell proliferation.

The pyruvate kinase activity of PKM2 can be promoted by SAICAR (succinylaminoimidazolecarboxamide ribose-5′-phosphate), an intermediate in purine biosynthesis. In cancer cells, glucose starvation leads to a rise in SAICAR levels and the subsequent stimulation of pyruvate kinase activity of PKM2. This allows for the completion of the glycolytic pathway to produce pyruvate and, therefore, survival under glucose deprivation. In addition, an abundance of SAICAR can modify glucose absorption and lactate production in cancer cells. However, it has been shown that SAICAR binding also sufficiently stimulates the protein kinase activity of PKM2 in tumor cells. In turn, the SAICAR-PKM2 complex can potentially phosphorylate a number of other protein kinases using PEP as the phosphate donor. Many of these proteins contribute to the regulation of cancer cell proliferation. Specifically, PKM2 can be a component in mitogen-activated protein kinase (MAPK) signaling, which is associated with increased cell proliferation if functioning improperly. This provides a potential link between SAICAR-activated PKM2 and cancer cell growth.

=== Natural mutations and carcinogenesis ===
Two missense mutations, H391Y and K422R, of PKM2 were found in cells from Bloom syndrome patients prone to developing cancer. Results show that, despite the presence of mutations in the inter-subunit contact domain, the K422R and H391Y mutant proteins maintained their homotetrameric structure, similar to the wild-type protein, but showed a loss of activity of 75 and 20%, respectively. H391Y showed a 6-fold increase in affinity for its substrate phosphoenolpyruvate and behaved like a non-allosteric protein with compromised cooperative binding. However, the affinity for phosphoenolpyruvate was lost significantly in K422R. Unlike K422R, H391Y showed enhanced thermal stability, stability over a range of pH values, a lesser effect of the allosteric inhibitor Phe, and resistance toward structural alteration upon binding of the activator (fructose 1,6-bisphosphate) and inhibitor (Phe). Both mutants showed a slight shift in the pH optimum from 7.4 to 7.0. The co-expression of homotetrameric wild type and mutant PKM2 in the cellular milieu resulting in the interaction between the two at the monomer level was substantiated further by in vitro experiments. The cross-monomer interaction significantly altered the oligomeric state of PKM2 by favoring dimerisation and heterotetramerization. In silico study provided an added support in showing that hetero-oligomerization was energetically favorable. The hetero-oligomeric populations of PKM2 showed altered activity and affinity, and their expression resulted in an increased growth rate of Escherichia coli as well as mammalian cells, along with an increased rate of polyploidy. These features are known to be essential to tumor progression.

Further, cells stably expressing exogenous wild- or mutant-PKM2 (K422R or H391Y) or co-expressing both wild and mutant (PKM2-K422R or PKM2-H391Y), were assessed for cancer metabolism and tumorigenic potential. Cells co-expressing PKM2 and mutant (K422R or H391Y) showed significantly aggressive cancer metabolism, compared to cells expressing either wild or mutant PKM2 independently. A similar trend was observed for oxidative endurance, tumorigenic potential, cellular proliferation and tumor growth. These observations signify the dominant negative nature of these mutations. Remarkably, PKM2-H391Y co-expressed cells showed a maximal effect on all the studied parameters. Such a dominant negative impaired function of PKM2 in tumor development is not known; also evidencing for the first time the possible predisposition of BS patients with impaired PKM2 activity to cancer, and the importance of studying genetic variations in PKM2 in future to understand their relevance in cancer in general.

=== Regulatory circuits ===
Cancer cells are characterized by a reprogramming of energy metabolism. Over the last decade, understanding of the metabolic changes that occur in cancer has increased dramatically, and there is great interest in targeting metabolism for cancer therapy. PKM2 plays a key role in modulating glucose metabolism to support cell proliferation. PKM2, like other PK isoforms, catalyzes the last energy-generating step in glycolysis, but is unique in its capacity to be regulated. PKM2 is regulated on several cellular levels, including gene expression, alternative splicing and post-translational modification. In addition, PKM2 is regulated by key metabolic intermediates and interacts with more than twenty different proteins. Hence, this isoenzyme is an important regulator of glycolysis and additional functions in other novel roles that have recently emerged. Recent evidence indicates that intervening in the complex regulatory network of PKM2 has severe consequences on tumor cell proliferation, indicating the potential of this enzyme as a target for tumor therapy.

=== Bacterial pathogenesis ===
With the yeast two-hybrid system, gonococcal Opa proteins were found to interact with PKM2. The results suggest that direct molecular interaction with the host metabolic enzyme PKM2 is required for the acquisition of pyruvate and for gonococcal growth and survival.

== Interactive pathway map ==
Click on genes, proteins and metabolites below to link to respective articles. (Note: The interactive pathway map can be edited at WikiPathways: "GlycolysisGluconeogenesis_WP534".)

Glycolysis and Gluconeogenesis edit

== See also ==
- Pyruvate kinase
- Tumor M2-PK
- Bloom syndrome
