= Glutaminolysis =

Glutaminolysis (glutamine + -lysis) is a series of biochemical reactions by which the amino acid glutamine is lysed to glutamate, aspartate, CO_{2}, pyruvate, lactate, alanine and citrate.

== The glutaminolytic pathway ==
Glutaminolysis partially recruits reaction steps from the citric acid cycle and the malate-aspartate shuttle.

=== Reaction steps from glutamine to α-ketoglutarate ===
The conversion of the amino acid glutamine to α-ketoglutarate takes place in two reaction steps:

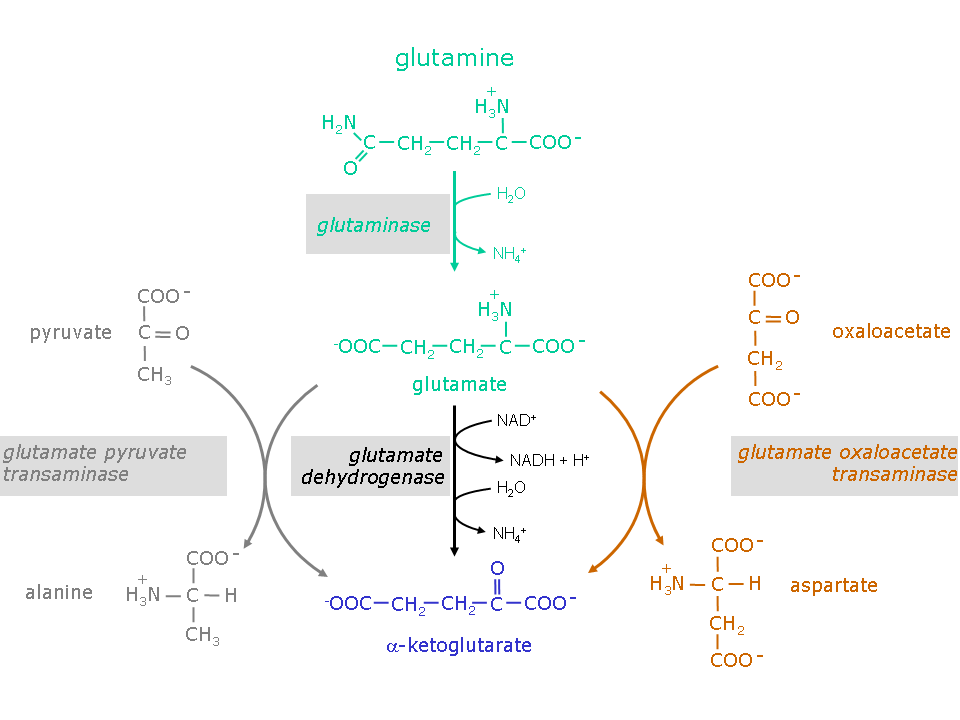
Conversion of glutamine to α-ketoglutarate

1. Hydrolysis of the amino group of glutamine yielding glutamate and ammonium. Catalyzing enzyme: glutaminase (EC 3.5.1.2)

2. Glutamate can be excreted or can be further metabolized to α-ketoglutarate.

For the conversion of glutamate to α-ketoglutarate three different reactions are possible:

Catalyzing enzymes:

- glutamate dehydrogenase (GlDH), EC 1.4.1.2
- glutamate pyruvate transaminase (GPT), also called alanine transaminase (ALT), EC 2.6.1.2
- glutamate oxaloacetate transaminase (GOT), also called aspartate transaminase (AST), EC 2.6.1.1 (component of the malate aspartate shuttle)

=== Recruited reaction steps of the citric acid cycle and malate aspartate shuttle ===
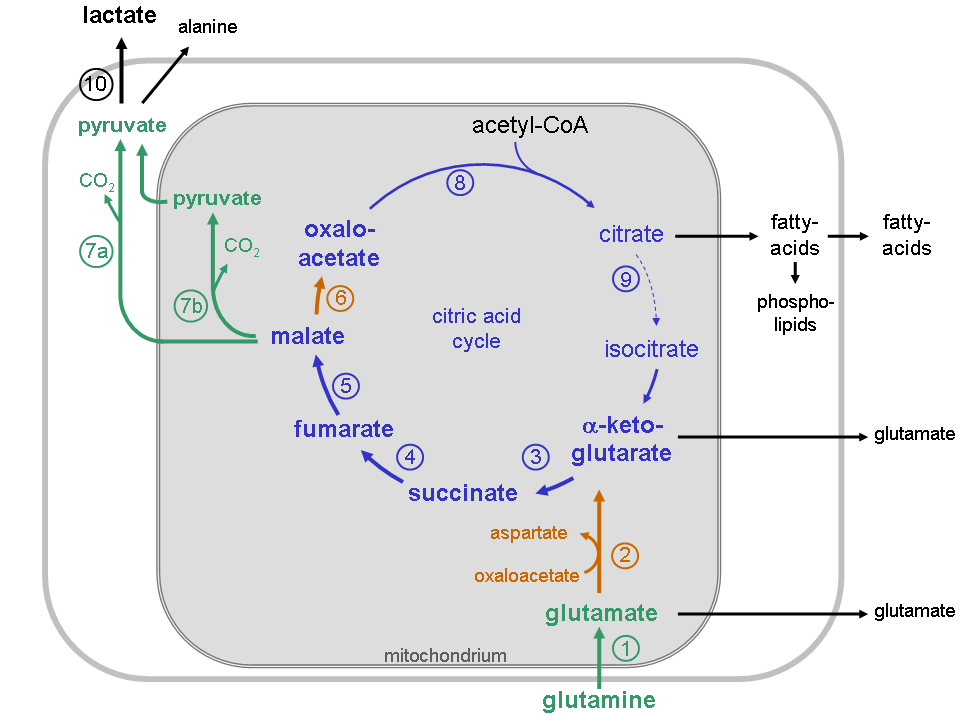
The glutaminolytic pathway. Figure legend: blue color = reaction steps of the citric acid cycle; brown color = reaction steps of the malate aspartate shuttle; green color = enzymes overexpressed in tumors. 1 = glutaminase, 2 = GOT, 3 = α-ketoglutarate dehydrogenase, 4 = succinate dehydrogenase, 5 = fumarase, 6 = malate dehydrogenase, 7a = cytosolic malic enzyme, 7b = mitochondrial malic enzyme, 8 = citrate synthase, 9 = aconitase, 10 = lactate dehydrogenase

- α-ketoglutarate + NAD^{+} + CoASH → succinyl-CoA + NADH+H^{+} + CO_{2}

catalyzing enzyme: α-ketoglutarate dehydrogenase complex

- succinyl-CoA + GDP + P_{i} → succinate + GTP

catalyzing enzyme: succinyl-CoA-synthetase, EC 6.2.1.4

- succinate + FAD → fumarate + FADH_{2}

catalyzing enzyme: succinate dehydrogenase, EC 1.3.5.1

- fumarate + H_{2}O → malate

catalyzing enzyme: fumarase, EC 4.2.1.2

- malate + NAD^{+} → oxaloacetate + NADH + H^{+}

catalyzing enzyme: malate dehydrogenase, EC 1.1.1.37 (component of the malate aspartate shuttle)

- oxaloacetate + acetyl-CoA + H_{2}O → citrate + CoASH

catalyzing enzyme: citrate synthase, EC 2.3.3.1

=== Reaction steps from malate to pyruvate and lactate ===
The conversion of malate to pyruvate and lactate is catalyzed by

- NAD(P) dependent malate decarboxylase (malic enzyme; EC 1.1.1.39 and 1.1.1.40) and
- lactate dehydrogenase (LDH; EC 1.1.1.27)

according to the following equations:

- malate + NAD(P)^{+}→ pyruvate + NAD(P)H + H^{+} + CO_{2}
- pyruvate + NADH + H^{+} → lactate + NAD^{+}

== Intracellular compartmentalization of the glutaminolytic pathway ==
The reactions of the glutaminolytic pathway take place partly in the mitochondria and to some extent in the cytosol (compare the metabolic scheme of the glutaminolytic pathway).

== An important energy source in tumor cells ==
Glutaminolysis takes place in all proliferating cells, such as lymphocytes, thymocytes, colonocytes, adipocytes and especially in tumor cells. Glutaminolysis has been targeted for therapeutic purposes. In tumor cells the citric acid cycle is truncated due to an inhibition of the enzyme aconitase (EC 4.2.1.3) by high concentrations of reactive oxygen species (ROS) Aconitase catalyzes the conversion of citrate to isocitrate. On the other hand, tumor cells over express phosphate dependent glutaminase and NAD(P)-dependent malate decarboxylase, which in combination with the remaining reaction steps of the citric acid cycle from α-ketoglutarate to citrate impart the possibility of a new energy producing pathway, the degradation of the amino acid glutamine to glutamate, aspartate, pyruvate CO_{2}, lactate and citrate.

Besides glycolysis in tumor cells glutaminolysis is another main pillar for energy production. High extracellular glutamine concentrations stimulate tumor growth and are essential for cell transformation. On the other hand, a reduction of glutamine correlates with phenotypical and functional differentiation of the cells.

=== Energy efficacy of glutaminolysis in tumor cells ===
- one ATP by direct phosphorylation of GDP
- two ATP from oxidation of FADH_{2}
- three ATP at a time for the NADH + H^{+} produced within the α-ketoglutarate dehydrogenase reaction, the malate dehydrogenase reaction and the malate decarboxylase reaction.

Due to low glutamate dehydrogenase and glutamate pyruvate transaminase activities, in tumor cells the conversion of glutamate to alpha-ketoglutarate mainly takes place via glutamate oxaloacetate transaminase.

=== Advantages of glutaminolysis in tumor cells ===
- Glutamine is the most abundant amino acid in the plasma and an additional energy source in tumor cells especially when glycolytic energy production is low due to a high amount of the dimeric form of M2-PK.
- Glutamine and its degradation products glutamate and aspartate are precursors for nucleic acid and serine synthesis.
- Glutaminolysis is insensitive to high concentrations of reactive oxygen species (ROS).
- Due to the truncation of the citric acid cycle the amount of acetyl-CoA infiltrated in the citric acid cycle is low and acetyl-CoA is available for de novo synthesis of fatty acids and cholesterol. The fatty acids can be used for phospholipid synthesis or can be released.
- Fatty acids represent an effective storage vehicle for hydrogen. Therefore, the release of fatty acids is an effective way to get rid of cytosolic hydrogen produced within the glycolytic glyceraldehyde 3-phosphate dehydrogenase (GAPDH; EC 1.2.1.9) reaction.
- Glutamate and fatty acids are immunosuppressive. The release of both metabolites may protect tumor cells from immune attacks.
- It has been discussed that the glutamate pool may drive the endergonic uptake of other amino acids by system ASC.
- Glutamine can be converted to citrate without NADH production, uncoupling NADH production from biosynthesis.

== See also ==
- Citric acid cycle
- Malate-aspartate shuttle
