= Glutaminase =

Enzyme that converts glutamine into glutamate

glutaminase
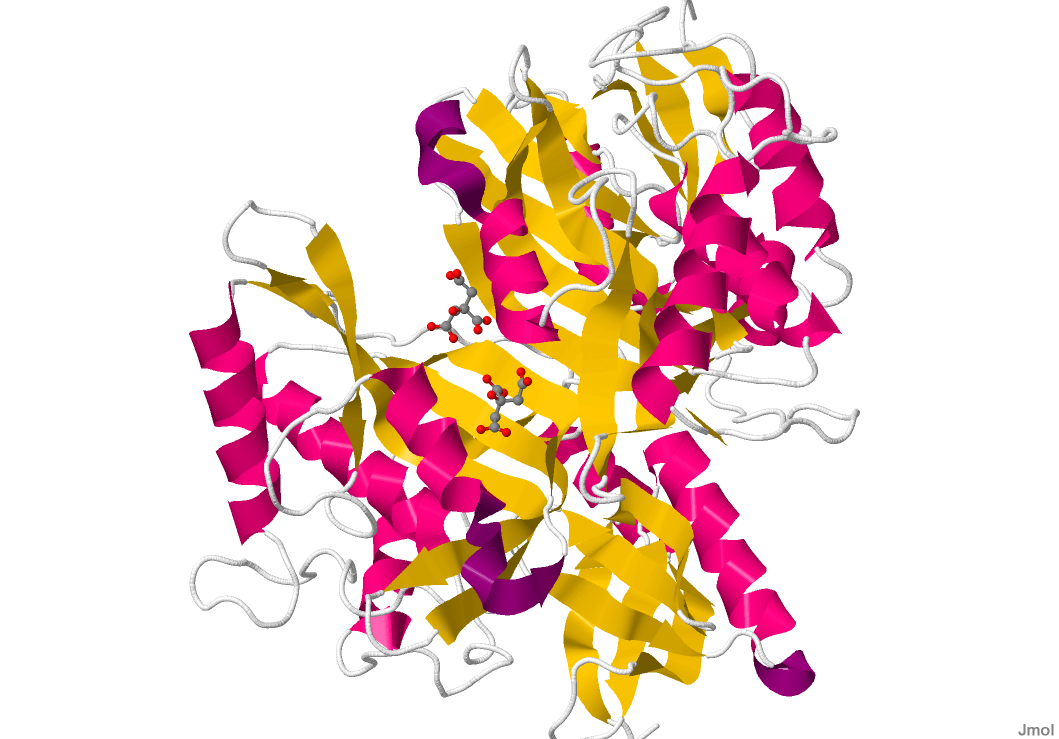
- Crystallographic structure of dimeric protein-glutaminase from Chryseobacterium proteolyticum.

Identifiers
- EC no.: 3.5.1.2
- CAS no.: 9001-47-2

Databases
- BRENDA: enzyme data
- ExPASy: NiceZyme view
- KEGG: enzyme entry
- MetaCyc: metabolic pathway
- Rhea: reactions
- PDB structures: RCSB PDB PDBe PDBsum
- Gene Ontology: AmiGO / QuickGO
Search
- PMC: articles
- PubMed: articles
- NCBI: proteins

Glutaminase
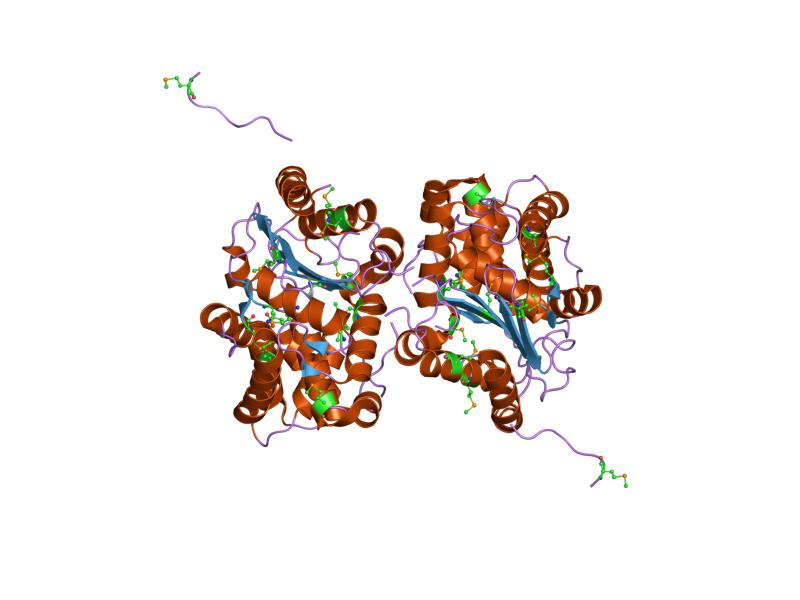
- probable glutaminase from bacillus subtilis complexed with 6-diazo-5-oxo-ʟ-norleucine

Identifiers
- Symbol: Glutaminase
- Pfam: PF04960
- Pfam clan: CL0013
- InterPro: IPR015868
- SCOP2: 1mki / SCOPe / SUPFAM
Available protein structures:
- PDB: IPR015868 PF04960 (ECOD; PDBsum)
- AlphaFold: IPR015868; PF04960

Glutaminase (EC 3.5.1.2, glutaminase I, L-glutaminase, glutamine aminohydrolase) is an amidohydrolase enzyme that generates glutamate from glutamine. Glutaminase has tissue-specific isoenzymes. Glutaminase has an important role in glial cells. In humans, 3 genes encode proteins that can act as glutaminases: GLS, GLS2, and CAD.

== Function ==
Glutaminase catalyzes the reaction in which the amino acid, glutamine, is hydrolysed to L-glutamic acid and ammonia:

glutamine
H_{2}O
NH_{3}
L-glutamic acid

This reaction is useful in the food industry, as it converts free glutamine into the umami-tasting glutamic acid.

== Tissue distribution ==
Glutaminase is expressed and active in periportal hepatocytes, where it generates ammonium for urea synthesis, as does glutamate dehydrogenase. Glutaminase is also expressed in the epithelial cells of the renal tubules, where the produced ammonia is excreted as ammonium ions. This excretion of ammonium ions is an important mechanism of renal acid-base regulation. During chronic acidosis, glutaminase is induced in the kidney, which leads to an increase in the amount of ammonium ions excreted. Glutaminase can also be found in the intestines, whereby hepatic portal ammonia can reach as high as 0.26 mM (compared to an arterial blood ammonia of 0.02 mM).

One of the most important roles of glutaminase is found in the axonal terminals of neurons in the central nervous system. Glutamate is the most abundantly used excitatory neurotransmitter in the CNS. After being released into the synapse for neurotransmission, glutamate is rapidly taken up by nearby astrocytes, which convert it to glutamine. This glutamine is then supplied to the presynaptic terminals of the neurons, where glutaminases convert it back to glutamate for loading into synaptic vesicles. Although both "kidney-type" (GLS1) and "liver-type" (GLS2) glutaminases are expressed in brain, GLS2 has been reported to exist only in cellular nuclei in CNS neurons.

== Regulation ==
ADP is the strongest adenine nucleotide activator of glutaminase. Studies have also suggested ADP lowered the K_{m} for glutamine and increased the V_{max}. They found that these effects were increased even more when ATP was present.

The end product of the glutaminase reaction, glutamate, is a strong inhibitor of the reaction. Changes in glutamate dehydrogenase, which converts glutamate to 2-oxoglutarate and thereby decreases intramitochondrial glutamate levels, are thereby an important regulatory mechanism of glutaminase activity.

Phosphate-activated mitochondrial glutaminase (GLS1) is suggested to be linked with elevated metabolism, decreased intracellular reactive oxygen species (ROS) levels, and overall decreased DNA oxidation in both normal and stressed cells. It is suggested that GLS2's control of ROS levels facilitates "the ability of p53 to protect cells from accumulation of genomic damage and allows cells to survive after mild and repairable genotoxic stress."

== Isozymes ==
Humans express 4 isoforms of glutaminase. GLS encodes 2 types of kidney-type glutaminase with a high activity and low Km. GLS2 encodes 2 forms of liver-type glutaminase with a low activity and allosteric regulation.

glutaminase (kidney, mitochondrial)

Identifiers
- Symbol: GLS
- NCBI gene: 2744
- HGNC: 4331
- OMIM: 138280
- RefSeq: NM_014905
- UniProt: O94925

Other data
- EC number: 3.5.1.2
- Locus: Chr. 2 q32-q34
Search for
- Structures: Swiss-model
- Domains: InterPro

glutaminase 2 (liver)

Identifiers
- Symbol: GLS2
- NCBI gene: 27165
- HGNC: 29570
- OMIM: 606365
- RefSeq: NM_013267
- UniProt: Q9UI32

Other data
- EC number: 3.5.1.2
- Locus: Chr. 12 q13
Search for
- Structures: Swiss-model
- Domains: InterPro

== Related proteins ==
Glutaminases belong to a larger family that includes serine-dependent beta-lactamases and penicillin-binding proteins. Many bacteria have two isozymes. This model is based on selected known glutaminases and their homologs within prokaryotes, with the exclusion of highly derived (long-branch) and architecturally varied homologs, so as to achieve conservative assignments. A sharp drop in scores occurs below 250, and cutoffs are set accordingly. The enzyme converts glutamine to glutamate, with the release of ammonia. Members tend to be described as glutaminase A (glsA), where B (glsB) is unknown and may not be homologous (as in Rhizobium etli; some species have two isozymes that may both be designated A (GlsA1 and GlsA2).

== Clinical significance ==
Many cancers rely on glutaminase thus glutaminase inhibitors have been proposed as a cancer treatment. Some glutaminase inhibitors such as JHU-083 are in clinical trials.

In 2021, it was reported that a GLS1 inhibitor eliminated senescent cells from various organs and tissues in aged mice, ameliorating age-associated tissue dysfunction. Results suggest that senescent cells rely on glutaminolysis, and inhibition of glutaminase 1 may offer a promising strategy for inducing senolysis in vivo.

A very rare glutaminase deficiency was first described in 2018, presenting with neonatal epileptic encephalopathy.
