= PPP1R13L =

Protein-coding gene in the species Homo sapiens

Identifiers
- Aliases: PPP1R13L, IASPP, NKIP1, RAI, RAI4, protein phosphatase 1 regulatory subunit 13 like
- External IDs: OMIM: 607463; MGI: 3525053; GeneCards: PPP1R13L
Available structures
PDB	Ortholog search: PDBe RCSB
PDB	List of PDB id codes 2VGE

Gene location (Human)
Chr.	Chromosome 19 (human)
Band	19q13.32	Start	45,379,638 bp
Band	19q13.32	End	45,406,349 bp

Gene location (Mouse)
Chr.	Chromosome 7 (mouse)
Band	7 A3|7 9.62 cM	Start	19,093,674 bp
Band	7 A3|7 9.62 cM	End	19,112,458 bp
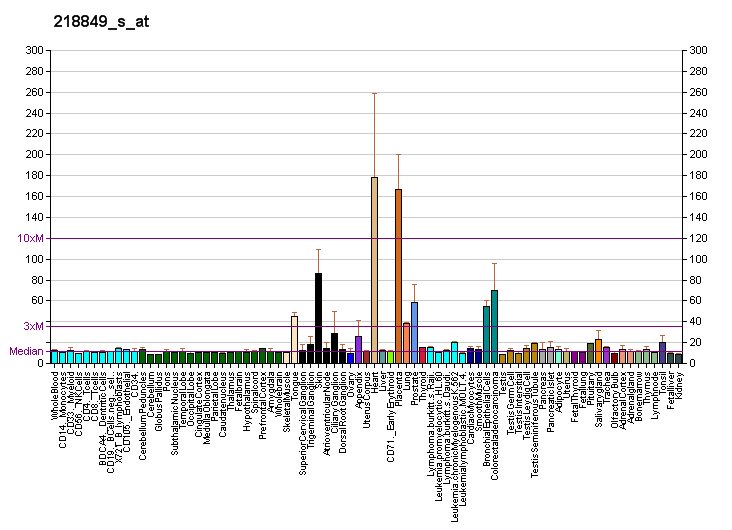
RNA expression pattern
Bgee	Human / Mouse (ortholog); Top expressed in: skin of abdomen; skin of leg; apex of heart; left ventricle; right auricle of heart; right coronary artery; skin of thigh; ascending aorta; minor salivary glands; skin of arm / Top expressed in: interventricular septum; lip; iris; retinal pigment epithelium; gastrula; skin of abdomen; cornea; esophagus; salivary gland; submandibular gland; More reference expression data
BioGPS	More reference expression data
Gene ontology
Molecular function	transcription factor binding; protein binding; transcription corepressor activity; identical protein binding; cadherin binding
Cellular component	cell junction; nucleus; intercellular bridge; nucleoplasm; cytoplasm; cytosol
Biological process	embryonic camera-type eye development; hair cycle; ventricular cardiac muscle tissue development; regulation of transcription, DNA-templated; negative regulation of transcription by RNA polymerase II; cardiac right ventricle morphogenesis; post-embryonic development; multicellular organismal homeostasis; cardiac muscle contraction; positive regulation of cell differentiation; transcription, DNA-templated; multicellular organism growth; apoptotic process; regulation of signal transduction by p53 class mediator
Sources:Amigo / QuickGO
Orthologs
Databases	NCBI: entry; OMA: entry
Species	Human	Mouse
Entrez	10848	333654
Ensembl	ENSG00000104881	ENSMUSG00000040734
UniProt	Q8WUF5	Q5I1X5
RefSeq (mRNA)	NM_006663; NM_001142502	NM_001010836
RefSeq (protein)	NP_001135974; NP_006654	NP_001010836
Location (UCSC)	Chr 19: 45.38 – 45.41 Mb	Chr 7: 19.09 – 19.11 Mb
PubMed search
- Wikidata
View/Edit Human	View/Edit Mouse

RelA-associated inhibitor is a protein that in humans is encoded by the PPP1R13L gene.

== Interactions ==
PPP1R13L has been shown to interact with Sp1 transcription factor and RELA.
