= RNF25 =

Protein-coding gene in the species Homo sapiens

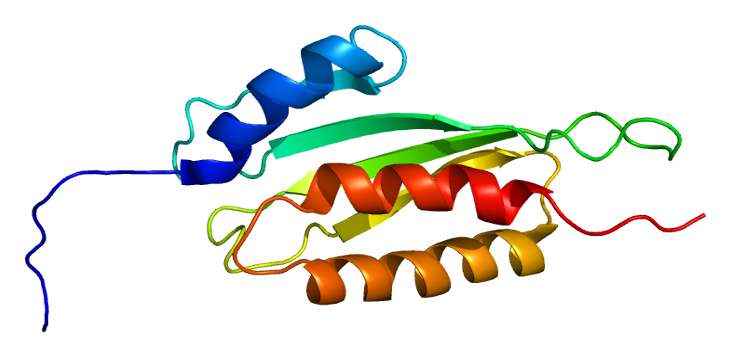

Identifiers
- Aliases: RNF25, AO7, ring finger protein 25
- External IDs: OMIM: 616014; MGI: 1890215; GeneCards: RNF25
Available structures
PDB	Ortholog search: PDBe RCSB
PDB	List of PDB id codes 2DAY, 2DMF, 5D1M, 5D1L, 5D1K
Enzyme activity
EC #	BRENDA	ExPASy	KEGG	MetaCyc
2.3.2.27	↗	↗	↗	↗

Gene location (Human)
Chr.	Chromosome 2 (human)
Band	2q35	Start	218,663,892 bp
Band	2q35	End	218,672,002 bp

Gene location (Mouse)
Chr.	Chromosome 1 (mouse)
Band	1|1 C4	Start	74,632,907 bp
Band	1|1 C4	End	74,640,556 bp
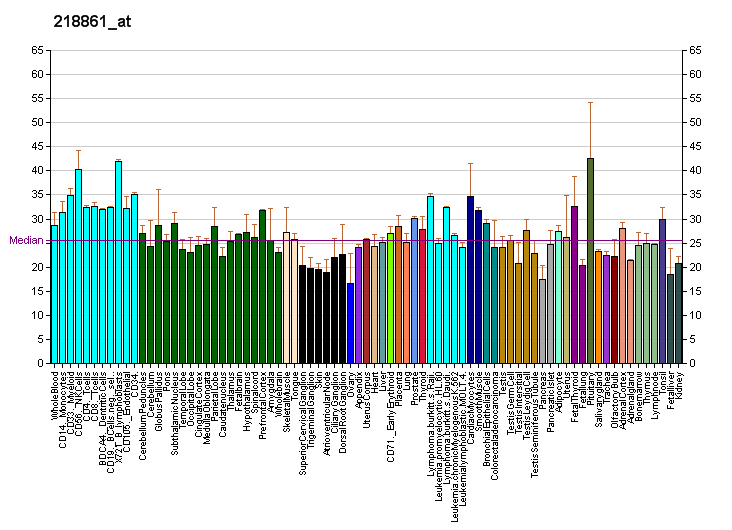
RNA expression pattern
Bgee	Human / Mouse (ortholog); Top expressed in: anterior pituitary; granulocyte; popliteal artery; tibial arteries; prefrontal cortex; Descending thoracic aorta; left testis; right testis; stromal cell of endometrium; right frontal lobe / Top expressed in: neural layer of retina; granulocyte; spermatid; superior frontal gyrus; yolk sac; seminiferous tubule; cerebellar cortex; dentate gyrus of hippocampal formation granule cell; ventricular zone; primary visual cortex; More reference expression data
BioGPS	More reference expression data
Gene ontology
Molecular function	metal ion binding; ubiquitin protein ligase activity; NF-kappaB binding; ubiquitin-protein transferase activity; transferase activity; protein binding
Cellular component	cytosol; nucleus
Biological process	positive regulation of NF-kappaB transcription factor activity; protein ubiquitination
Sources:Amigo / QuickGO
Orthologs
Databases	NCBI: entry; OMA: entry
Species	Human	Mouse
Entrez	64320	57751
Ensembl	ENSG00000163481	ENSMUSG00000026171
UniProt	Q96BH1	Q9QZR0
RefSeq (mRNA)	NM_022453	NM_021313; NM_001305230
RefSeq (protein)	NP_071898	NP_001292159; NP_067288
Location (UCSC)	Chr 2: 218.66 – 218.67 Mb	Chr 1: 74.63 – 74.64 Mb
PubMed search
- Wikidata
View/Edit Human	View/Edit Mouse

E3 ubiquitin-protein ligase RNF25 is an enzyme that in humans is encoded by the RNF25 gene.

== Function ==
The protein encoded by this gene contains a RING finger motif. The mouse counterpart of this protein has been shown to interact with Rela, the p65 subunit of NF-kappaB (NF-κB), and modulate NF-κB-mediated transcription activity. The mouse protein also binds ubiquitin-conjugating enzymes (E2s) and is a substrate for E2-dependent ubiquitination.

== Interactions ==
RNF25 has been shown to interact with RELA.
