= DAP3 =

Protein found in humans

Identifiers
- Aliases: DAP3, DAP-3, MRP-S29, MRPS29, bMRP-10, death associated protein 3, S29mt
- External IDs: OMIM: 602074; MGI: 1929538; GeneCards: DAP3
Available structures
PDB	Ortholog search: PDBe RCSB
PDB	List of PDB id codes 3J9M

Gene location (Human)
Chr.	Chromosome 1 (human)
Band	1q22	Start	155,687,960 bp
Band	1q22	End	155,739,010 bp

Gene location (Mouse)
Chr.	Chromosome 3 (mouse)
Band	3 F1|3 39.01 cM	Start	88,828,110 bp
Band	3 F1|3 39.01 cM	End	88,858,488 bp
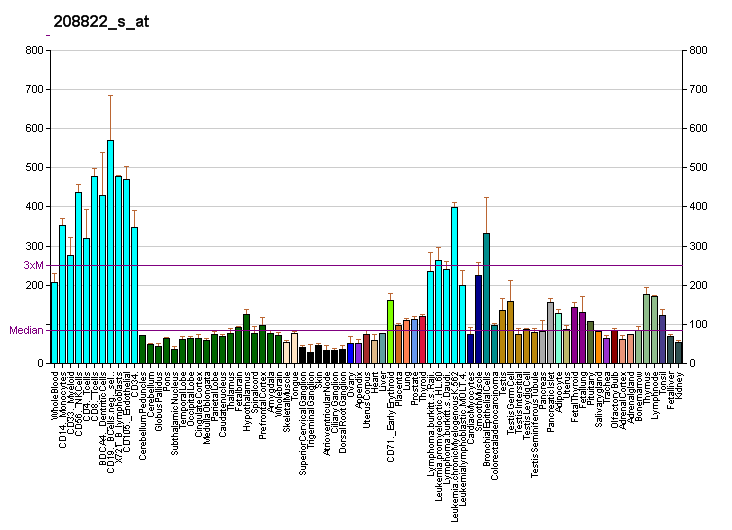
RNA expression pattern
Bgee	Human / Mouse (ortholog); Top expressed in: body of pancreas; epithelium of colon; rectum; lymph node; islet of Langerhans; granulocyte; apex of heart; buccal mucosa cell; monocyte; anterior pituitary / Top expressed in: spermatocyte; spermatid; seminiferous tubule; ventricular zone; thymus; facial motor nucleus; yolk sac; right ventricle; primary oocyte; fetal liver hematopoietic progenitor cell; More reference expression data
BioGPS	More reference expression data
Gene ontology
Molecular function	structural constituent of ribosome; protein binding; RNA binding; nucleotide binding; GTP binding
Cellular component	small ribosomal subunit; mitochondrial inner membrane; ribosome; mitochondrial ribosome; mitochondrion; mitochondrial small ribosomal subunit; nucleoplasm
Biological process	apoptotic signaling pathway; mitochondrial translational elongation; mitochondrial translational termination; apoptotic process
Sources:Amigo / QuickGO
Orthologs
Databases	NCBI: entry; OMA: entry
Species	Human	Mouse
Entrez	7818	65111
Ensembl	ENSG00000132676	ENSMUSG00000068921
UniProt	P51398	Q9ER88
RefSeq (mRNA)	NM_001199849; NM_001199850; NM_001199851; NM_004632; NM_033657	NM_001164533; NM_022994; NM_001368419
RefSeq (protein)	NP_001186778; NP_001186779; NP_001186780; NP_004623; NP_387506	NP_001158005; NP_075370; NP_001355348
Location (UCSC)	Chr 1: 155.69 – 155.74 Mb	Chr 3: 88.83 – 88.86 Mb
PubMed search
- Wikidata
View/Edit Human	View/Edit Mouse

28S ribosomal protein S29, mitochondrial, also known as death-associated protein 3 (DAP3), is a protein that in humans is encoded by the DAP3 gene on chromosome 1. This gene encodes a 28S subunit protein of the mitochondrial ribosome (mitoribosome) and plays key roles in translation, cellular respiration, and apoptosis. Moreover, DAP3 is associated with cancer development, but has been observed to aid some cancers while suppressing others.

== Structure ==
The DAP3 gene encodes a 46 kDa protein located in the lower area of the small mitoribosomal subunit. This protein contains a P-loop motif that binds GTP and a highly conserved 17-residue targeting sequence responsible for its localization to the mitochondria. Of interest, many of the phosphorylation sites on this protein are highly conserved and clustered around GTP-binding motifs.

Several splice variants were observed in human ESTs that differ largely in the 5’ UTR region. Pseudogenes for this gene are also found in chromosomes 1 and 2.

== Function ==
DAP3 is a 28S subunit protein of mitoribosomes and localizes to the mitochondrial matrix. As part of the mitoribosome, DAP3 participates in the translation of the 13 ETC complex proteins encoded in the mitochondrial genome, and consequently, in the regulation of cellular respiration. As a member of the death-associated protein (DAP) family, DAP3 can also be found outside of the mitochondria to initiate the extrinsic apoptotic pathway through its interactions with apoptotic factors, such as tumor necrosis factor-alpha, Fas ligand, and gamma interferon. Additionally, DAP3 interacts with the factor IPS-1 to activate caspases 3, 8, and 9, resulting in a type of extracellular apoptosis called anoikis. Moreover, DAP3 may contribute to apoptosis through its mediation of mitochondrial fragmentation, as this function extends to the mediation of the oxidative stress response, reactive oxygen species (ROS) production, and ultimately, mitochondrial homeostasis. DAP3 is essential for life, and its deletion in embryos is lethal. Nonetheless, DAP3 and its apoptotic activity can be inhibited by AKT phosphorylation.

== Clinical significance ==
As aforementioned, death associated protein 3 (DAP3) has regulatory roles in cell respiration and apoptosis. Both opposites and cell respiration are important elements of cell death pathways and have underlying mechanistic roles in ischemia-reperfusion injury.

During a normal embryologic processes, or during cell injury (such as ischemia-reperfusion injury during heart attacks and strokes) or during developments and processes in cancer, an apoptotic cell undergoes structural changes including cell shrinkage, plasma membrane blebbing, nuclear condensation, and fragmentation of the DNA and nucleus. This is followed by fragmentation into apoptotic bodies that are quickly removed by phagocytes, thereby preventing an inflammatory response. It is a mode of cell death defined by characteristic morphological, biochemical and molecular changes. It was first described as a "shrinkage necrosis", and then this term was replaced by apoptosis to emphasize its role opposite mitosis in tissue kinetics. In later stages of apoptosis the entire cell becomes fragmented, forming a number of plasma membrane-bounded apoptotic bodies which contain nuclear and or cytoplasmic elements. The ultrastructural appearance of necrosis is quite different, the main features being mitochondrial swelling, plasma membrane breakdown and cellular disintegration. Apoptosis occurs in many physiological and pathological processes. It plays an important role during embryonal development as programmed cell death and accompanies a variety of normal involutional processes in which it serves as a mechanism to remove "unwanted" cells.

DAP3 has been implicated in numerous cancers. Studies demonstrated that DAP3 expression tended to be low to nonexistent in the tumor cells of B-cell lymphoma, non-small cell lung cancer, head and neck cancer, breast cancer, gastric cancer, and colon cancer, possibly due to hypermethylation of the gene's promoter. Moreover, DAP3 expression has been positively correlated with improved cancer prognosis, indicating that the protein combats cancer progression through its proapoptotic function. As a result, DAP3 could serve as a potential biomarker to monitor the effectiveness of therapeutic treatments such as chemotherapy. However, in other cancers, such as glioblastoma multiforme (GBM) and thymoma, DAP3 expression was found to be upregulated. Thus, the specific role of DAP3 in various cancers requires further study.

== Interactions ==
DAP3 has been shown to interact with:

- DELE,
- IPS-1,
- AKT,
- PKA,
- PKC,
- NOA1,
- FADD,
- Glucocorticoid receptor,
- Heat shock protein 90kDa alpha (cytosolic), member A1, and
- TNFRSF10A.
