= DEDD =

Protein-coding gene in humans

Identifiers
- Aliases: DEDD, CASP8IP1, DEDD1, DEFT, FLDED1, KE05, death effector domain containing
- External IDs: OMIM: 606841; MGI: 1333874; HomoloGene: 7980; GeneCards: DEDD; OMA:DEDD - orthologs

Gene location (Human)
Chr.	Chromosome 1 (human)
Band	1q23.3	Start	161,120,974 bp
Band	1q23.3	End	161,132,688 bp

Gene location (Mouse)
Chr.	Chromosome 1 (mouse)
Band	1 H3|1 79.34 cM	Start	171,156,713 bp
Band	1 H3|1 79.34 cM	End	171,169,899 bp
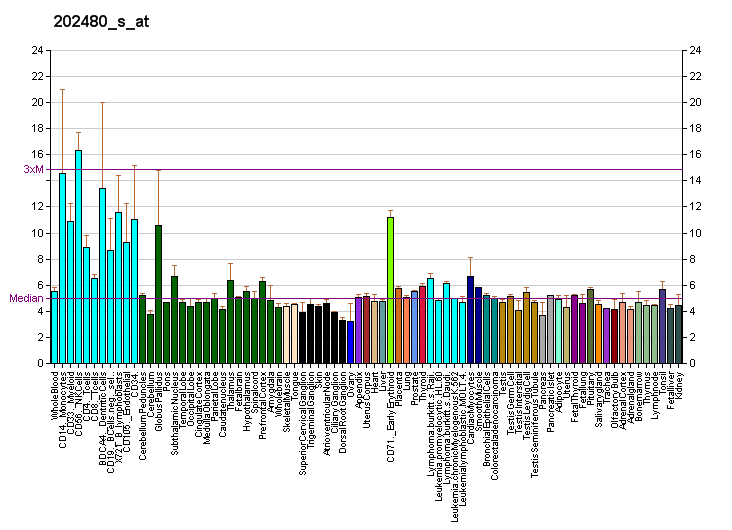

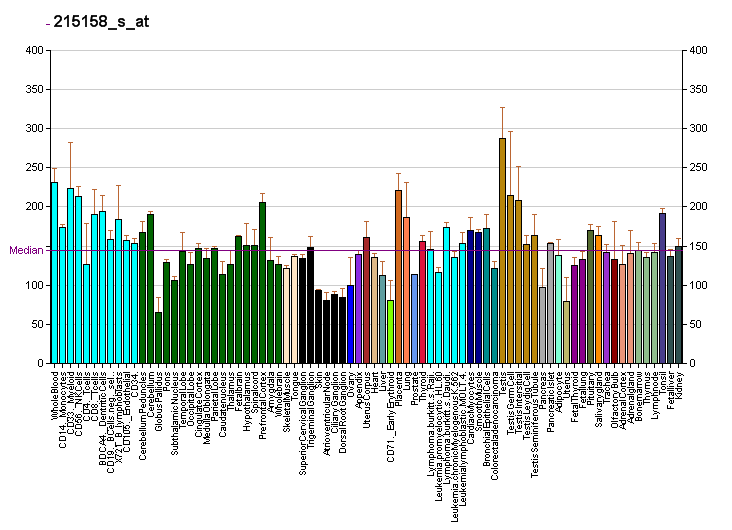

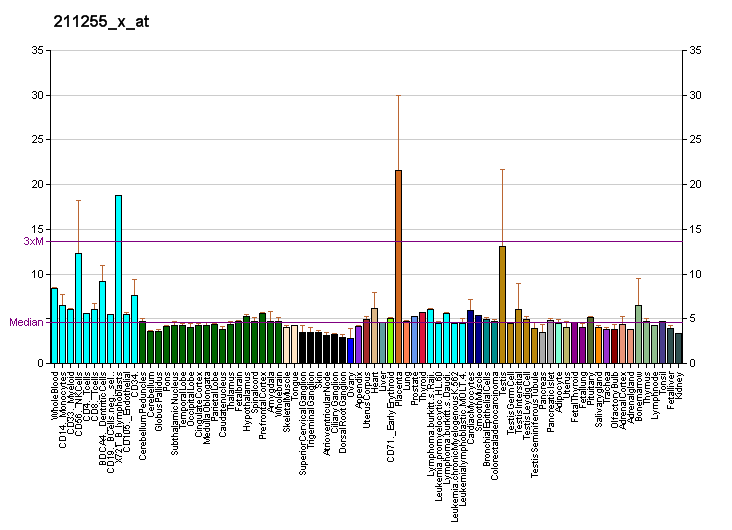
RNA expression pattern
Bgee	Human / Mouse (ortholog); Top expressed in: oocyte; gastrocnemius muscle; muscle of thigh; gastric mucosa; secondary oocyte; gallbladder; blood; granulocyte; right coronary artery; biceps brachii / Top expressed in: primary oocyte; neural layer of retina; spermatid; zygote; yolk sac; fossa; condyle; secondary oocyte; seminiferous tubule; muscle of thigh; More reference expression data
BioGPS	More reference expression data
Gene ontology
Molecular function	protein binding; DNA binding
Cellular component	cytoplasm; nucleus; nucleolus
Biological process	regulation of apoptotic process; regulation of transcription, DNA-templated; transcription, DNA-templated; apoptotic process; spermatogenesis; extrinsic apoptotic signaling pathway via death domain receptors; negative regulation of protein catabolic process; decidualization; negative regulation of transcription of nucleolar large rRNA by RNA polymerase I
Sources:Amigo / QuickGO
Orthologs
Species	Human	Mouse
Entrez	9191	21945
Ensembl	ENSG00000158796	ENSMUSG00000013973
UniProt	O75618	Q9Z1L3
RefSeq (mRNA)	NM_001039711; NM_001039712; NM_004216; NM_032998; NM_001330765	NM_001128609; NM_011615; NM_001357550; NM_001357551; NM_001357552 NM_001357553
RefSeq (protein)	NP_001034800; NP_001034801; NP_001317694; NP_127491	NP_001122081; NP_035745; NP_001344479; NP_001344480; NP_001344481 NP_001344482
Location (UCSC)	Chr 1: 161.12 – 161.13 Mb	Chr 1: 171.16 – 171.17 Mb
PubMed search
- Wikidata
View/Edit Human	View/Edit Mouse

Death effector domain containing protein is a protein that in humans is encoded by the DEDD gene.

== Function ==
This gene encodes a protein that contains a death effector domain (DED). DED is a protein–protein interaction domain shared by adaptors, regulators and executors of the programmed cell death pathway. Overexpression of this gene was shown to induce weak apoptosis. Upon stimulation, this protein was found to translocate from cytoplasm to nucleus and colocalize with UBTF, a basal factor required for RNA polymerase I transcription, in the nucleolus. At least three transcript variants encoding the same protein have been found for this gene.

== Interactions ==
DEDD has been shown to interact with:

- CFLAR,
- Caspase 8, and
- FADD.
