= RIPK1 =

Enzyme found in humans

Identifiers
- Aliases: RIPK1, RIP, RIP1, RIP-1, receptor interacting serine/threonine kinase 1, IMD57, AIEFL
- External IDs: OMIM: 603453; MGI: 108212; GeneCards: RIPK1
Available structures
PDB	Ortholog search: PDBe RCSB
PDB	List of PDB id codes 4ITH, 4ITI, 4ITJ, 4NEU, 5HX6
Enzyme activity
EC #	BRENDA	ExPASy	KEGG	MetaCyc
2.7.11.1	↗	↗	↗	↗

Gene location (Human)
Chr.	Chromosome 6 (human)
Band	6p25.2	Start	3,063,824 bp
Band	6p25.2	End	3,115,187 bp

Gene location (Mouse)
Chr.	Chromosome 13 (mouse)
Band	13 A3.3|13 14.01 cM	Start	34,186,346 bp
Band	13 A3.3|13 14.01 cM	End	34,221,130 bp
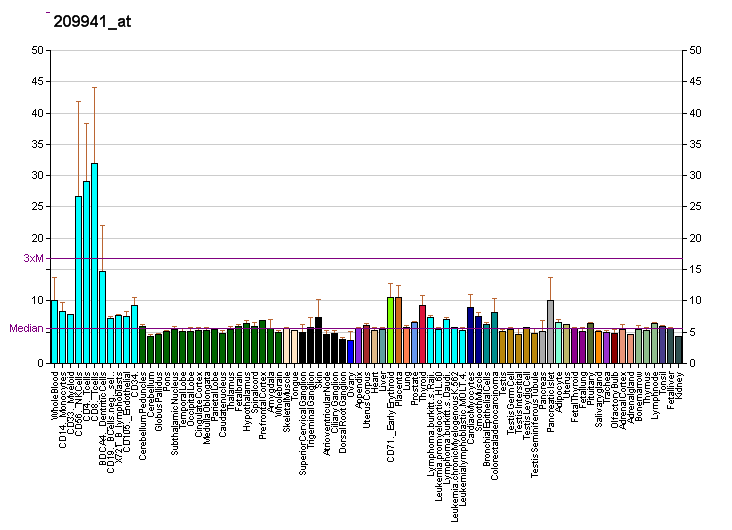
RNA expression pattern
Bgee	Human / Mouse (ortholog); Top expressed in: granulocyte; sural nerve; right lobe of liver; stromal cell of endometrium; gastric mucosa; Achilles tendon; right coronary artery; skin of abdomen; skin of leg; apex of heart / Top expressed in: renal corpuscle; Paneth cell; endothelial cell of lymphatic vessel; granulocyte; stroma of bone marrow; left lobe of liver; epithelium of stomach; jejunum; conjunctival fornix; fetal liver hematopoietic progenitor cell; More reference expression data
BioGPS	More reference expression data
Gene ontology
Molecular function	transferase activity; protein kinase activity; nucleotide binding; death domain binding; kinase activity; protein serine/threonine kinase activity; protein binding; identical protein binding; ATP binding; ubiquitin protein ligase binding; signal transducer activity; protein-containing complex binding; death receptor binding; JUN kinase kinase kinase activity
Cellular component	membrane; receptor complex; plasma membrane; mitochondrion; death-inducing signaling complex; membrane raft; cytoplasm; cytosol; endosome membrane; ripoptosome; protein-containing complex
Biological process	T cell apoptotic process; positive regulation of protein phosphorylation; amyloid fibril formation; positive regulation of cell death; phosphorylation; regulation of ATP:ADP antiporter activity; peptidyl-serine autophosphorylation; regulation of tumor necrosis factor-mediated signaling pathway; positive regulation of macrophage differentiation; cellular response to tumor necrosis factor; cellular response to growth factor stimulus; negative regulation of extrinsic apoptotic signaling pathway; positive regulation of programmed cell death; tumor necrosis factor-mediated signaling pathway; positive regulation of JNK cascade; regulation of reactive oxygen species metabolic process; negative regulation of I-kappaB kinase/NF-kappaB signaling; TRIF-dependent toll-like receptor signaling pathway; response to tumor necrosis factor; positive regulation of necroptotic process; protein phosphorylation; positive regulation of reactive oxygen species metabolic process; death-inducing signaling complex assembly; positive regulation of NF-kappaB transcription factor activity; necroptotic signaling pathway; positive regulation of interleukin-8 production; positive regulation of tumor necrosis factor production; positive regulation of apoptotic process; positive regulation of I-kappaB kinase/NF-kappaB signaling; positive regulation of extrinsic apoptotic signaling pathway; protein autophosphorylation; regulation of extrinsic apoptotic signaling pathway via death domain receptors; necroptosis; positive regulation of phosphorylation; negative regulation of extrinsic apoptotic signaling pathway in absence of ligand; I-kappaB kinase/NF-kappaB signaling; activation of cysteine-type endopeptidase activity involved in apoptotic process; protein homooligomerization; positive regulation of transcription by RNA polymerase II; ripoptosome assembly; signal transduction; positive regulation of MAPK cascade; positive regulation of hydrogen peroxide-induced cell death; apoptotic signaling pathway; apoptotic process; programmed cell death; extrinsic apoptotic signaling pathway; positive regulation of necrotic cell death; negative regulation of extrinsic apoptotic signaling pathway via death domain receptors; protein deubiquitination; ripoptosome assembly involved in necroptotic process; MyD88-independent toll-like receptor signaling pathway; toll-like receptor 3 signaling pathway; viral process; protein heterooligomerization; MAPK cascade; negative regulation of cardiac muscle cell proliferation; cellular response to hydrogen peroxide; programmed necrotic cell death; positive regulation of tumor necrosis factor-mediated signaling pathway; positive regulation of production of miRNAs involved in gene silencing by miRNA; negative regulation of G1/S transition of mitotic cell cycle
Sources:Amigo / QuickGO
Orthologs
Databases	NCBI: entry; OMA: entry
Species	Human	Mouse
Entrez	8737	19766
Ensembl	ENSG00000137275	ENSMUSG00000021408
UniProt	Q13546	Q60855
RefSeq (mRNA)	NM_003804; NM_001317061; NM_001354930; NM_001354931; NM_001354932 NM_001354933; NM_001354934	NM_009068; NM_001359997
RefSeq (protein)	NP_001303990; NP_003795; NP_001341859; NP_001341860; NP_001341861 NP_001341862; NP_001341863	NP_033094; NP_001346926
Location (UCSC)	Chr 6: 3.06 – 3.12 Mb	Chr 13: 34.19 – 34.22 Mb
PubMed search
- Wikidata
View/Edit Human	View/Edit Mouse

Receptor-interacting serine/threonine-protein kinase 1 (RIPK1) functions in a variety of cellular pathways related to both cell survival and death. In terms of cell death, RIPK1 plays a role in apoptosis, necroptosis, and PANoptosis. Some of the cell survival pathways RIPK1 participates in include NF-κB, Akt, and JNK.

RIPK1 is an enzyme that in humans is encoded by the RIPK1 gene, which is located on chromosome 6. This protein belongs to the Receptor Interacting Protein (RIP) kinases family, which consists of seven members, RIPK1 being the first member of the family.

== Structure ==
RIPK1 protein is composed of 671 amino acids, and has a molecular weight of about 76 kDa. It contains a serine/threonine kinase domain (KD) in the 300 aa N-Terminus, a death domain (DD) in the 112 aa C-Terminus, and a central region between the KD and DD called intermediate domain (ID).

- The kinase domain plays different roles in cell survival and is important in necroptosis induction. RIP interacts with TRAF2 via the kinase domain. The KD can also interact with Necrostatin-1, which is an allosteric inhibitor of RIPK1 kinase activity. Overexpression of RIP lacking kinase activity can activate NF-kB.
- The death domain is homologous to the DD of other receptors such as Fas, TRAILR2 (DR5), TNFR1 and TRAILR1 (DR4), so it can bind to these receptors, as well as TRADD and FADD in the TNFR1 signalling complex. Overexpression of RIP can induce apoptosis and can activate NF-kB, but overexpression of the RIP death domain can block NF-kB activation by TNF-R1.
- The intermediate domain is important for NF-kB activation and (RHIM)-dependent signalling. Via the intermediate domain, RIP can interact with TRAF2, NEMO, RIPK3, ZBP1, OPTN and other small molecules and proteins, depending on cellular context.

.

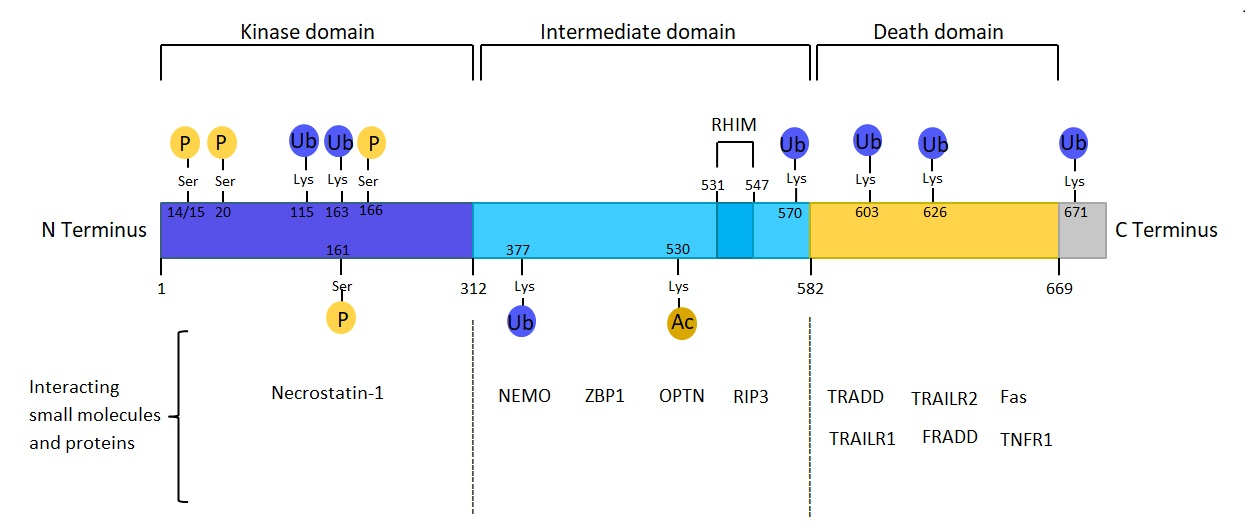
Structural domains of RIPK1

== Function ==
Although, RIPK1 has been primarily studied in the context of TNFR signaling, RIPK1 is also activated in response to diverse stimuli.

The kinase domain, while important for necroptotic (programmed necrotic) functions, appears dispensable for pro-survival roles. Kinase activity of RIPK1 is also required for RIPK1-dependent apoptosis in conditions of IAP1/2 depletion, RIPK3 depletion or MLKL depletion. Also, proteolytic processing of RIPK1, through both caspase-dependent and -independent mechanisms, triggers lethality that is dependent on the generation of one or more specific C-terminal cleavage product(s) of RIPk1 upon stress.

=== Role in cell survival ===
It has been shown that cell survival can be regulated through different RIPK1-mediated pathways that ultimately result in the expression of NF-kB, a protein complex known to regulate transcription of DNA and thus, related to survival processes.

==== Receptor-mediated signalling ====
The most well-known pathway of NF-kB activation is that mediated by the death receptor TNFR1, which starts as in the necroptosis pathway with the assembly of TRADD, RIPK1, TRAF2 and clAP1 in the lipid rafts of the plasma membrane (complex I is formed). In survival signalling, RIPK1 is then polyubiquitinated, allowing NEMO (Necrosis Factor – kappa – B essential modulator) to bind to the IkB kinase or IKK complex. To activate IKK, TAB2 and TAB3 adaptor proteins recruit TAK1 or MEKK3, which phosphorylate the complex. This results in the phosphorylation of the NF-kB inhibitors by the activated IKK complex, which in turn triggers their polyubiquitination and posterior degradation in the 26S proteasome.

As a result, NF-kB can now migrate to the nucleus where it will control DNA transcription by binding itself to the promoters of specific genes. Some of those genes are thought to have anti-apoptotic properties as well as to promote proteasomal degradation of RIPK1, resulting in a self-regulatory cycle.

While being in complex I, RIPK1 has also been proved to play a role in the activation of MAP (mitogen-activated protein) kinases such as JNK, ERK and p38. In particular, JNK can be found in both cell death and survival pathways, with its role in the cell death process being suppressed by activated NF-kB.

Cell survival signalling can also be mediated by TLR-3 (toll-like receptors) and TLR-4. In here, RIPK1 is recruited to the receptors where it is phosphorylated and polyubiquitinated. This results in the recruit of the IKK complex activating proteins (TAK1, TAB1 and TAB2) so eventually NF-kB can now too migrate to the nucleus. RIPK2 is involved in this TLR-mediated signalling, which suggests that there might be a regulation of cell survival or death (the two possible outcomes) through the mutual interaction between the two RIPK family members.

==== Genotoxic stress-mediated activation ====
Upon DNA damage, RIPK1 mediates another NF-kB activation pathway where two simultaneous and exclusive processes occur. A pro-apoptotic complex is created while RIPK1 also mediates the interaction between PIDD, NEMO and IKK subunits that will eventually result in the IKK complex activation after interaction with ATM kinase (a DNA double-strand breaks stimulated protein). The interaction between RIPK1 and PIDD through their death domains is thought to promote cell survival to neutralize this pro-apoptotic complex.

==== Others ====
It has been observed that RIPK1 may also interact with IGF-1R (insulin-like growth factor 1 receptor) to activate JNK (c-Jun N-terminal Kinases), it may be related to epidermal growth factor receptor signalling and it is largely expressed in glioblastoma cells, suggesting that RIPK1 is indeed involved in cell survival and proliferation processes.

=== Role in cell death ===
==== Necroptosis ====
Necroptosis is a programmed form of necrosis which starts with the assembly of the TNF (tumor necrosis factor) ligand to its membrane receptor, the TNFR (tumor necrosis factor receptor). Once activated, the intracellular domain of TNFR starts the recruitment of the adaptor TNFR-1-associated death domain protein TRADD, which recruits RIPK1 and two ubiquitin ligases: TRAF2 and clAP1. This complex is called the TNFR-1 complex I.

Complex-I is then modified by the IAPs (Inhibitor of Apoptosis Proteins) and the LUBAC (Linear Ubiquitination Assembly Complex), which generate linear ubiquitin linkages. The ubiquitination of complex-I leads to the activation of NF-κB, which in turn activates the expression of FLICE-like inhibitory protein FLIP. FLIP then binds to caspase-8, forming a caspase-8 FLIP heterodimer in the cytosol that disrupts the activity of caspase-8 and prevents caspase-8 mediated apoptosis from taking place.

The assembly of complex II-b then starts in the cytosol. This new complex contains the caspase-8 FLIP heterodimer as well as RIPK1 and RIPK3. Caspase inhibition within this complex allows RIPK1 and RIPK3 to autotransphosphorylate each other, forming another complex called the necrosome. The necrosome starts recruiting MLKL (Mixed Lineage Kinase Domain Like protein), which is phosphorylated by RIPK3 and immediately translocates to lipid rafts inside the plasma membrane. This leads to the formation of pores in the membrane, allowing the sodium influx to increase -and consequently the osmotic pressure-, which eventually causes cell membrane rupture.

==== Apoptosis ====
The apoptotic extrinsic pathway starts with the formation of the TNFR-1 complex-I, which contains TRADD, RIPK1, and two ubiquitin ligases: TRAF2 and clAP1.

Unlike the necroptotic pathway, this pathway doesn't include the inhibition of caspase-8. Thus, in absence of NF-κB function, FLIP is not produced, and therefore active caspase-8 assembles with FADD, RIPK1 and RIPK3 in the cytosol, forming what is known as complex IIa.

Caspase-8 activates Bid, a protein that binds to the mitochondrial membrane, allowing the release of intermembrane mitochondrial molecules such as cytochrome c. Cytochrome c then assembles with Apaf 1 and ATP molecules, forming a complex called apoptosome. The activation of caspase 3 and 9 by the apoptosome starts a proteolitic cascade that eventually leads to the degradation of organelles and proteins, and the fragmentation of the DNA, inducing apoptotic cell death.

==== PANoptosis ====
PANoptosis is a prominent innate immune, inflammatory, and lytic cell death pathway initiated by innate immune sensors and driven by caspases and receptor-interacting protein kinases (RIPKs) through PANoptosomes. PANoptosomes are multi-protein complexes assembled by germline-encoded pattern-recognition receptor(s) (PRRs) (innate immune sensor(s)) in response to pathogens, including bacterial, viral, and fungal infections, as well as pathogen-associated molecular patterns, damage-associated molecular patterns, cytokines, and homeostatic changes during infections, inflammatory conditions, and cancer. RIPK1 has been identified as a component of multiple PANoptosomes, including the ZBP1-PANoptosome and the AIM2-PANoptosome. Additionally, RIPK1 also drives the formation of the RIPK1-PANoptosome to induce PANoptosis in response to TAK1 inhibition. TAK1 is a central regulator in cell death that prevents spontaneous NLRP3 inflammasome activation and PANoptosis in a RIPK1-dependent manner. Additionally, the Gram-negative bacterium Yersinia produces YopJ, which inhibits TAK1, and Yersinia infection can trigger the activation of the RIPK1-PANoptosome.

== Neurodegenerative diseases ==
=== Alzheimer's disease ===
Patients with Alzheimer's disease, a neurodegenerative disease characterized by a cognitive deterioration and a behavioural disorder, experience a chronic brain inflammation which leads to the atrophy of several brain regions.

A sign of this inflammation is an increased number of microglia, a type of glial cells located in the brain and the spinal cord. RIPK1 is known to appear in larger quantities in brains from those affected with AD. This enzyme regulates not only necroptosis, but cell inflammation as well, and as a result it is involved in the regulation of microglial functions, specially those associated with the appearance and development of neurodegenerative diseases such as AD.

=== Amyotrophic Lateral Sclerosis ===
Amyotrophic Lateral Sclerosis (ALS) is characterized by the degeneration of motor neurons which leads to the progressive loss of mobility. Consequently, patients are unable to do any physical activity due to the atrophy of their muscles.

The optineurin gene (OPTN) and its mutation are known to be involved in ALS. When the organism loses OPTN, the dysmyelination of axons and its degeneration start. The degeneration of the axons is produced by several components from the Central Nervous System (CNS) including RIPK1 and another enzyme from the Receptor Interacting Protein kinases family, RIPK3, as well as other proteins such as MLKL.

Once RIPK1, RIPK3 and MLKL have contributed to the dysmyelination and the consequent degeneration of axons, the nerve impulse can't to go from one neuron to another due to the lack of myelin, which leads to the consequent mobility problems as the nerve impulse does not arrive to its final destination.

=== Multiple sclerosis ===
RIPK1 plays a role in the activation of multiple sclerosis and its progression driving neuroinflammatory signaling in microglia And astrocytes. SAR443820 is an investigational RIPK1 inhibitor that may be useful in the management of multiple sclerosis.

== Autoinflamatory disease ==
An autoinflammatory disease characterised by recurrent fevers and lymphadenopathy has been associated with mutations in this gene.

CRIA syndrome (Cleavage-resistant RIPK1-induced autoinflammatory syndrome) is a disorder caused by specific mutations of the RIPK1 gene. Symptoms include "fevers, swollen lymph nodes, severe abdominal pain, gastrointestinal problems, headaches and, in some cases, abnormally enlarged spleen and liver".

== Interactions ==
RIPK1 has been shown to interact with:

- BIRC2,
- BIRC3,
- CA11,
- CASP8,
- CFLAR,
- CRADD,
- RIPK2,
- RIPK3,
- RNF11,
- RNF216,
- SQSTM1,
- TNFRSF1A,
- TRADD,
- TRAF2,
- UBC.
- clAP1
- IAPs
- LUBAC
- IGF-1R
- FLIP
- MLKL
