= C26H27N5O2 =

The molecular formula C_{26}H_{27}N_{5}O_{2} may refer to:

- UH15-38
- Vilazodone
- LY-2109761
