= CA11 =

CA11 may refer to:

- California State Route 11
- California's 11th congressional district
- Kambara Station, a railway station in Shizuoka, Japan (station code: CA11)
- Carbonic anhydrase-related protein 11, encoded by the CA11 gene
- United States Court of Appeals for the Eleventh Circuit

== See also ==
- Carbonic anhydrase 2 (CA-II)
