= UH15-38 =

Antiviral drug

Clinical data
- Other names: HY-158312

Identifiers
- IUPAC name: 3-(3-hydroxyphenyl)-1-methyl-7-[3-(4-methylpiperazin-1-yl)anilino]-1,6-naphthyridin-2-one
- CAS Number: 2540881-21-6
- PubChem CID: 155288621

Chemical and physical data
- Formula: C_{26}H_{27}N_{5}O_{2}
- Molar mass: 441.535 g·mol^{−1}
- 3D model (JSmol): Interactive image
- SMILES: CN1CCN(CC1)C2=CC=CC(=C2)NC3=NC=C4C=C(C(=O)N(C4=C3)C)C5=CC(=CC=C5)O
- InChI: InChI=1S/C26H27N5O2/c1-29-9-11-31(12-10-29)21-7-4-6-20(15-21)28-25-16-24-19(17-27-25)14-23(26(33)30(24)2)18-5-3-8-22(32)13-18/h3-8,13-17,32H,9-12H2,1-2H3,(H,27,28); Key:DLRROFRAOBFFEP-UHFFFAOYSA-N

UH15-38 is an experimental receptor-interacting protein kinase 3 (RIPK3) inhibitor being studied as a potential treatment for influenza.

== Mechanism of action ==
UH15-38 targets and inhibits RIPK3, a key enzyme involved in necroptosis, a form of programmed cell death that can lead to excessive inflammation when left unchecked during severe influenza infections. By inhibiting RIPK3, UH15-38 appears to allow the immune system to effectively combat the virus while minimizing excessive cellular death and inflammatory responses, which in turn results in a decrease in lung damage.

== Research ==
In preclinical studies, UH15-38 demonstrated the ability to significantly reduce lung inflammation and injury in mouse models, even when administered up to five days after infection. This may lead to more effective treatments for severe influenza cases, potentially addressing an unmet medical need for patients who seek care several days after initial infection.
