= RNF216 =

Protein-coding gene in the species Homo sapiens

Identifiers
- Aliases: RNF216, CAHH, TRIAD3, U7I1, UBCE7IP1, ZIN, ring finger protein 216
- External IDs: OMIM: 609948; MGI: 1344349; GeneCards: RNF216
Enzyme activity
EC #	BRENDA	ExPASy	KEGG	MetaCyc
2.3.2.27	↗	↗	↗	↗

Gene location (Human)
Chr.	Chromosome 7 (human)
Band	7p22.1	Start	5,620,047 bp
Band	7p22.1	End	5,781,696 bp

Gene location (Mouse)
Chr.	Chromosome 5 (mouse)
Band	5|5 G2	Start	142,976,648 bp
Band	5|5 G2	End	143,098,749 bp
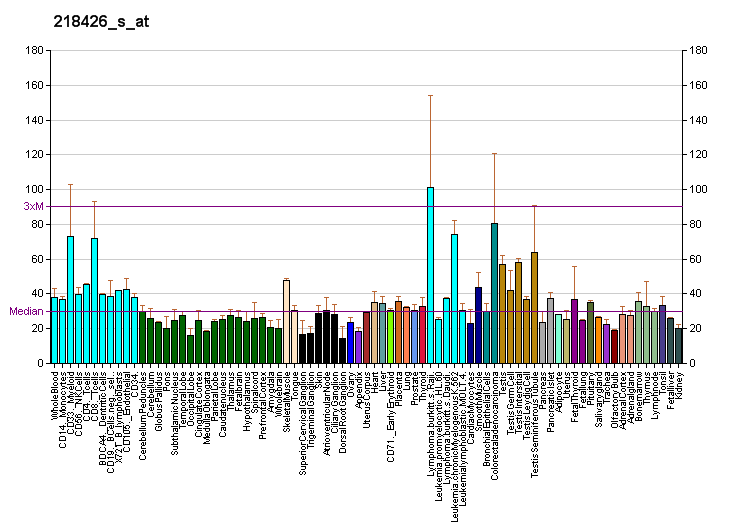

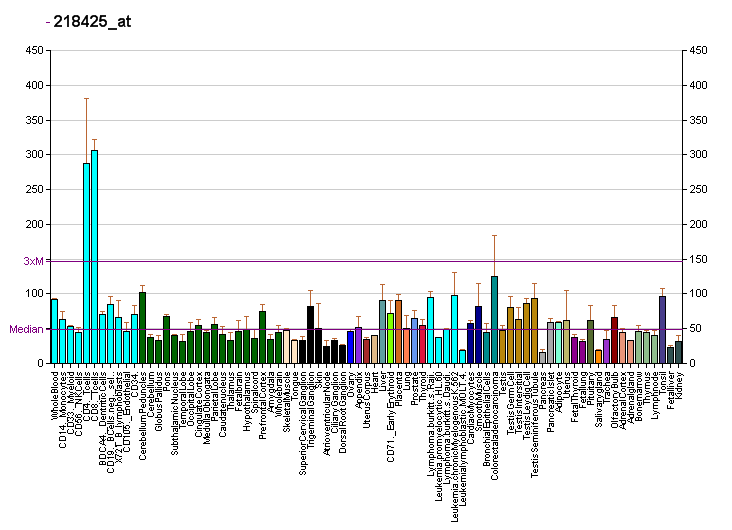
RNA expression pattern
Bgee	Human / Mouse (ortholog); Top expressed in: testicle; right testis; left testis; saphenous vein; sperm; stromal cell of endometrium; oocyte; granulocyte; Achilles tendon; secondary oocyte / Top expressed in: spermatid; hand; tail of embryo; spermatocyte; genital tubercle; otic vesicle; zygote; granulocyte; secondary oocyte; morula; More reference expression data
BioGPS	More reference expression data
Gene ontology
Molecular function	protein binding; metal ion binding; ubiquitin protein ligase activity; transferase activity
Cellular component	cytoplasm; nucleus; nucleoplasm; cytosol; Schaffer collateral - CA1 synapse; postsynaptic endocytic zone; glutamatergic synapse
Biological process	protein K48-linked ubiquitination; negative regulation of type I interferon production; viral process; regulation of interferon-beta production; protein ubiquitination; regulation of defense response to virus by host; proteasome-mediated ubiquitin-dependent protein catabolic process; apoptotic process; protein catabolic process, modulating synaptic transmission
Sources:Amigo / QuickGO
Orthologs
Databases	NCBI: entry; OMA: entry
Species	Human	Mouse
Entrez	54476	108086
Ensembl	ENSG00000011275	ENSMUSG00000045078
UniProt	Q9NWF9	P58283
RefSeq (mRNA)	NM_019011; NM_207111; NM_207116; NM_001377156	NM_080561; NM_207110; NM_001359851
RefSeq (protein)	NP_996994; NP_996999; NP_001364085	NP_542128; NP_996993; NP_001346780
Location (UCSC)	Chr 7: 5.62 – 5.78 Mb	Chr 5: 142.98 – 143.1 Mb
PubMed search
- Wikidata
View/Edit Human	View/Edit Mouse

E3 ubiquitin-protein ligase RNF216 is an enzyme that in humans is encoded by the RNF216 gene.

This gene encodes a cytoplasmic protein which specifically colocalizes and interacts with the serine/threonine protein kinase, receptor-interacting protein (RIP). Zinc finger domains of the encoded protein are required for its interaction with RIP and for inhibition of TNF- and IL1-induced NF-kappa B activation pathways. The encoded protein may also function as an E3 ubiquitin-protein ligase which accepts ubiquitin from E2 ubiquitin-conjugating enzymes and transfers it to substrates. Several alternatively spliced transcript variants have been described for this locus but the full-length natures of only some are known.

== See also ==
- RING finger domain

== Interactions ==
RNF216 has been shown to interact with TLR9 and RIPK1.
