= Mixed lineage kinase domain like pseudokinase =

Protein-coding gene in the species Homo sapiens

MLKL

Identifiers
- Aliases: MLKL, hmixed lineage kinase domain-like, mixed lineage kinase domain like pseudokinase
- External IDs: OMIM: 615153; MGI: 1921818; GeneCards: MLKL
Available structures
PDB	Ortholog search: PDBe RCSB
PDB	List of PDB id codes 2MSV, 4M67, 4MWI

Gene location (Human)
Chr.	Chromosome 16 (human)
Band	16q23.1	Start	74,671,855 bp
Band	16q23.1	End	74,700,960 bp

Gene location (Mouse)
Chr.	Chromosome 8 (mouse)
Band	8|8 E1	Start	112,038,429 bp
Band	8|8 E1	End	112,064,809 bp
RNA expression pattern
Bgee	Human / Mouse (ortholog); Top expressed in: granulocyte; monocyte; blood; spleen; upper lobe of left lung; appendix; myocardium of left ventricle; right lung; pancreatic epithelial cell; mucosa of ileum / Top expressed in: bone marrow; epithelium of stomach; stroma of bone marrow; endothelial cell of lymphatic vessel; duodenum; transitional epithelium of urinary bladder; Paneth cell; subcutaneous adipose tissue; colon; jejunum; More reference expression data
BioGPS	n/a
Gene ontology
Molecular function	nucleotide binding; protein binding; ATP binding; protein kinase binding; protein kinase activity; identical protein binding; signal transducer activity; protein-containing complex binding; protein serine/threonine kinase activity; JUN kinase kinase kinase activity
Cellular component	cytoplasm; cytosol; plasma membrane; membrane
Biological process	necroptosis; protein homotrimerization; programmed cell death; protein phosphorylation; intracellular signal transduction; cell surface receptor signaling pathway; MAPK cascade
Sources:Amigo / QuickGO
Orthologs
Databases	NCBI: entry; OMA: entry
Species	Human	Mouse
Entrez	197259	74568
Ensembl	ENSG00000168404	ENSMUSG00000012519
UniProt	Q8NB16	Q9D2Y4
RefSeq (mRNA)	NM_001142497; NM_152649	NM_029005; NM_001310613
RefSeq (protein)	NP_001135969; NP_689862	NP_001297542; NP_083281
Location (UCSC)	Chr 16: 74.67 – 74.7 Mb	Chr 8: 112.04 – 112.06 Mb
PubMed search
- Wikidata
View/Edit Human	View/Edit Mouse

Mixed lineage kinase domain like pseudokinase (MLKL) is a protein that in humans is encoded by the MLKL gene.

== Function ==
This gene belongs to the protein kinase superfamily. The encoded protein contains a protein kinase-like domain; however, is thought to be inactive because it lacks several residues required for activity. This protein plays a critical role in tumor necrosis factor (TNF)-induced necroptosis, a programmed cell death process, via interaction with receptor-interacting protein 3 (RIP3), which is a key signaling molecule in necroptosis pathway. Inhibitor studies and knockdown of this gene inhibited TNF-induced necrosis.

=== Influence in diseases ===
High levels of this protein and RIP3 are associated with inflammatory bowel disease in children. Alternatively spliced transcript variants have been described for this gene. [provided by RefSeq, Sep 2015]. A unique neurodegenerative disease has been reported in association with a homozygous frameshift mutation, rs561839347, in MLKL that causes replacement of part of the C-terminal pseudokinase domain with a 21-residue sequence of random amino acids.

== See also ==
- Necroptosis
- Cell death
