= RIP kinase =

RIP kinases (receptor-interacting protein kinases) are a class of serine/threonine protein kinases. In humans, five different RIP kinases are known:

- RIPK1
- RIPK2
- RIPK3
- RIPK4
- RIPK5 (ANKK1)
