= TRADD =

Protein-coding gene in the species Homo sapiens

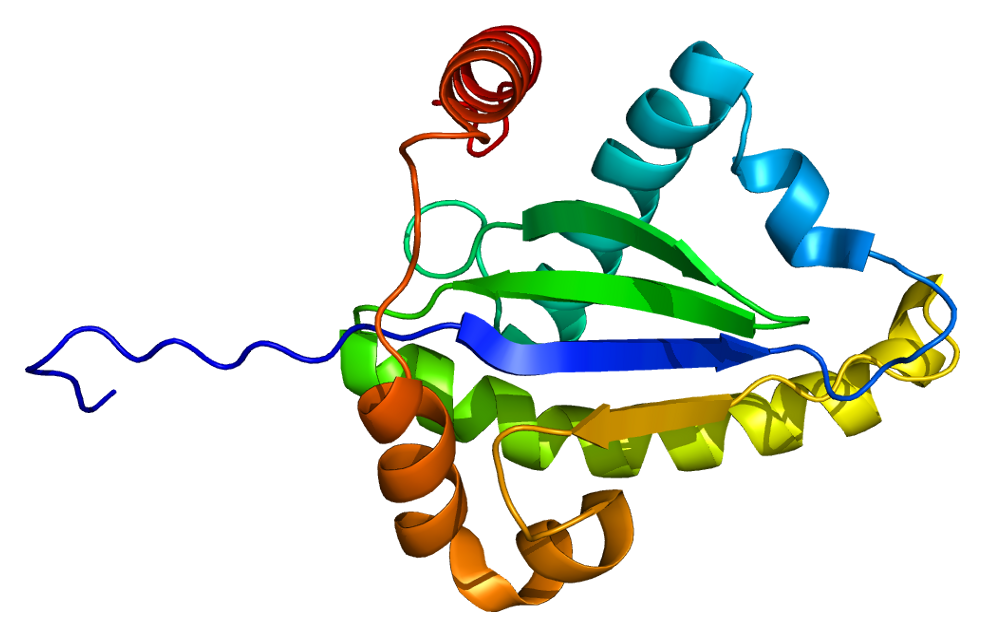
Available structures
PDB	Ortholog search: PDBe RCSB
PDB	List of PDB id codes 1F2H, 1F3V

Identifiers
- Aliases: TRADD, Hs.89862, TNFRSF1A associated via death domain
- External IDs: OMIM: 603500; MGI: 109200; HomoloGene: 2807; GeneCards: TRADD; OMA:TRADD - orthologs

Gene location (Human)
Chr.	Chromosome 16 (human)
Band	16q22.1	Start	67,154,185 bp
Band	16q22.1	End	67,159,909 bp

Gene location (Mouse)
Chr.	Chromosome 8 (mouse)
Band	8 D3|8 53.04 cM	Start	105,984,918 bp
Band	8 D3|8 53.04 cM	End	105,991,241 bp
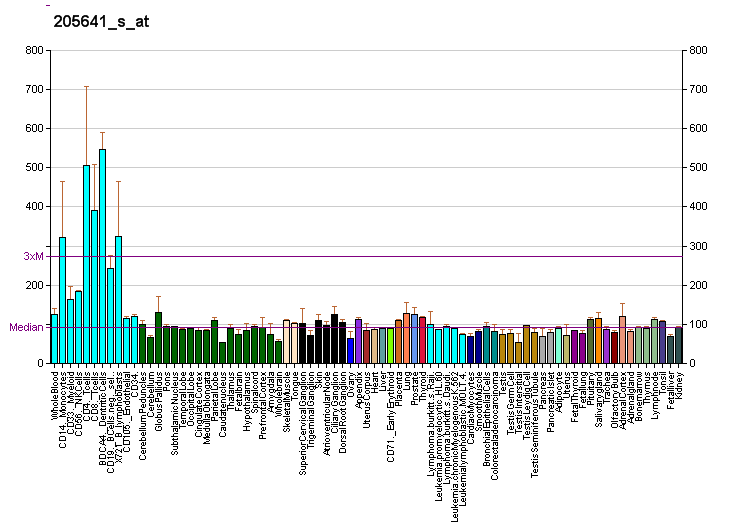

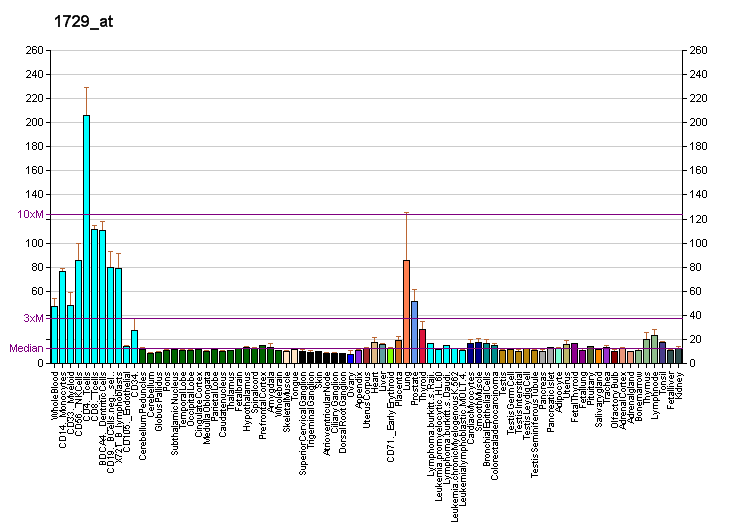
RNA expression pattern
Bgee	Human / Mouse (ortholog); Top expressed in: pancreatic ductal cell; granulocyte; right uterine tube; mucosa of transverse colon; amniotic fluid; parotid gland; blood; palpebral conjunctiva; epithelium of nasopharynx; gingival epithelium / Top expressed in: intestinal villus; left colon; Ileal epithelium; lumbar spinal ganglion; jejunum; plantaris muscle; extensor digitorum longus muscle; duodenum; blood; epithelium of stomach; More reference expression data
BioGPS	More reference expression data
Gene ontology
Molecular function	death domain binding; kinase binding; protein binding; identical protein binding; tumor necrosis factor receptor binding; protein-containing complex binding; molecular adaptor activity; transmembrane receptor protein tyrosine kinase adaptor activity
Cellular component	cytoplasm; cytosol; receptor complex; plasma membrane; death-inducing signaling complex; membrane raft; cytoskeleton; nucleus; protein-containing complex
Biological process	extrinsic apoptotic signaling pathway; positive regulation of hair follicle development; regulation of tumor necrosis factor-mediated signaling pathway; tumor necrosis factor-mediated signaling pathway; death-inducing signaling complex assembly; positive regulation of NF-kappaB transcription factor activity; positive regulation of apoptotic process; positive regulation of I-kappaB kinase/NF-kappaB signaling; regulation of extrinsic apoptotic signaling pathway via death domain receptors; I-kappaB kinase/NF-kappaB signaling; activation of cysteine-type endopeptidase activity involved in apoptotic process; extrinsic apoptotic signaling pathway via death domain receptors; signal transduction; apoptotic process; negative regulation of extrinsic apoptotic signaling pathway via death domain receptors; protein heterooligomerization; positive regulation of cell migration; positive regulation of inflammatory response; cellular response to tumor necrosis factor; positive regulation of NIK/NF-kappaB signaling; transmembrane receptor protein tyrosine kinase signaling pathway
Sources:Amigo / QuickGO
Orthologs
Species	Human	Mouse
Entrez	8717	71609
Ensembl	ENSG00000102871	ENSMUSG00000031887
UniProt	Q15628	Q3U0V2
RefSeq (mRNA)	NM_003789; NM_153425; NM_001323552	NM_001033161
RefSeq (protein)	NP_001310481; NP_003780	NP_001028333
Location (UCSC)	Chr 16: 67.15 – 67.16 Mb	Chr 8: 105.98 – 105.99 Mb
PubMed search
- Wikidata
View/Edit Human	View/Edit Mouse

Tumor necrosis factor receptor type 1-associated DEATH domain protein is a protein that in humans is encoded by the TRADD gene.

TRADD is an adaptor protein.

== Function ==
The protein encoded by this gene is a death domain containing adaptor molecule that interacts with TNFRSF1A/TNFR1 and mediates programmed cell death signaling and NF-κB activation. This protein binds adaptor protein TRAF2, reduces the recruitment of inhibitor-of-apoptosis proteins (IAPs) by TRAF2, and thus suppresses TRAF2 mediated apoptosis. This protein can also interact with receptor TNFRSF6/FAS and adaptor protein FADD/MORT1, and is involved in the Fas-induced cell death pathway.

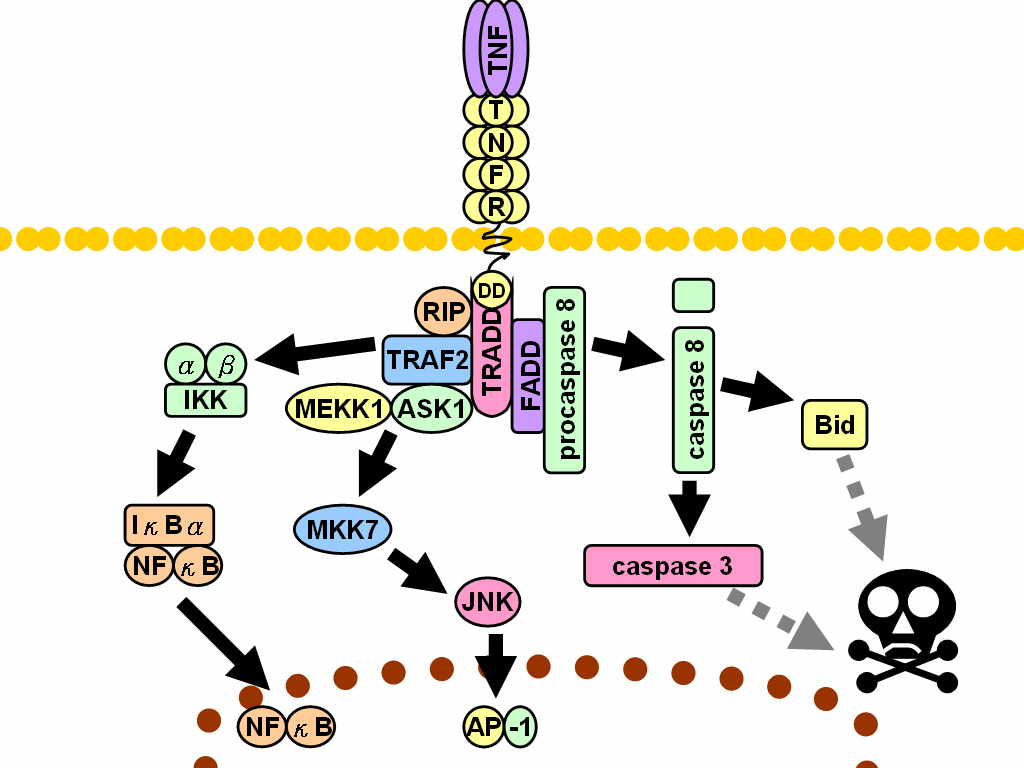
Signaling pathway of TNF-R1. Dashed grey lines represent multiple steps

== Interactions ==
TRADD has been shown to interact with:

- FADD,
- Keratin 18
- RIPK1,
- STAT1,
- TNFRSF1A,
- TNFRSF25, and
- TRAF2.

== See also ==
- TRAF
- RIP
