= FADD =

Human protein and coding gene

Identifiers
- Aliases: FADD, GIG3, MORT1, Fas associated via death domain, IMD90
- External IDs: OMIM: 602457; MGI: 109324; GeneCards: FADD
Available structures
PDB	Ortholog search: PDBe RCSB
PDB	List of PDB id codes 3OQ9, 1A1W, 1A1Z, 1E3Y, 1E41, 2GF5, 3EZQ

Gene location (Human)
Chr.	Chromosome 11 (human)
Band	11q13.3	Start	70,203,296 bp
Band	11q13.3	End	70,207,390 bp
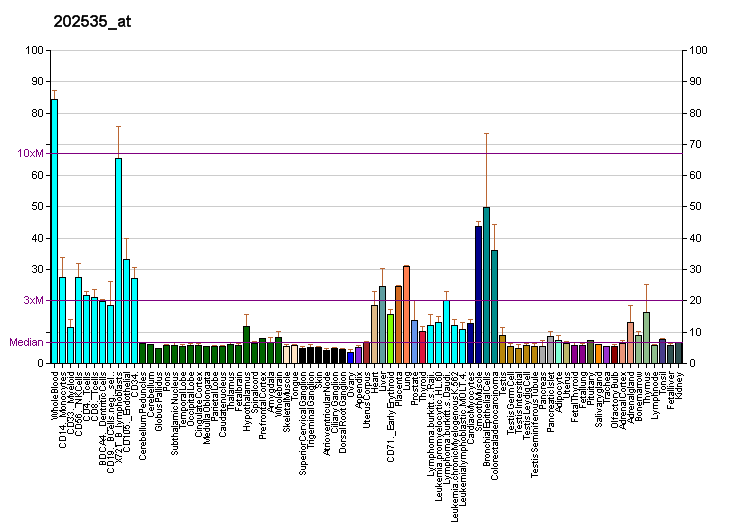
RNA expression pattern
Bgee	Human / Mouse (ortholog); Top expressed in: granulocyte; tendon of biceps brachii; stromal cell of endometrium; mucosa of transverse colon; blood; parotid gland; right adrenal gland; right adrenal cortex; left adrenal gland; epithelium of esophagus / n/a; More reference expression data
BioGPS	More reference expression data
Gene ontology
Molecular function	identical protein binding; tumor necrosis factor receptor superfamily binding; death effector domain binding; caspase binding; protein binding; protease binding; death receptor binding; tumor necrosis factor receptor binding; receptor serine/threonine kinase binding; protein-containing complex binding
Cellular component	cytosol; membrane raft; ripoptosome; cell body; neuron projection; CD95 death-inducing signaling complex; plasma membrane; death-inducing signaling complex; cytoplasm; nucleus; protein-containing complex
Biological process	TRAIL-activated apoptotic signaling pathway; regulation of extrinsic apoptotic signaling pathway via death domain receptors; motor neuron apoptotic process; immune system process; necroptotic signaling pathway; activation of cysteine-type endopeptidase activity involved in apoptotic process; negative regulation of necroptotic process; positive regulation of interleukin-8 production; positive regulation of type I interferon-mediated signaling pathway; cell surface receptor signaling pathway; TRIF-dependent toll-like receptor signaling pathway; positive regulation of macrophage differentiation; defense response to virus; activation of cysteine-type endopeptidase activity; apoptotic signaling pathway; cellular response to mechanical stimulus; extrinsic apoptotic signaling pathway in absence of ligand; positive regulation of transcription by RNA polymerase II; extrinsic apoptotic signaling pathway via death domain receptors; regulation of apoptotic process; death-inducing signaling complex assembly; positive regulation of extrinsic apoptotic signaling pathway via death domain receptors; positive regulation of tumor necrosis factor production; positive regulation of I-kappaB kinase/NF-kappaB signaling; signal transduction; positive regulation of proteolysis; viral process; apoptotic process; positive regulation of activated T cell proliferation; extrinsic apoptotic signaling pathway; positive regulation of T cell mediated cytotoxicity; positive regulation of extrinsic apoptotic signaling pathway; thymus development; positive regulation of adaptive immune response; T cell differentiation in thymus; innate immune response; spleen development; negative regulation of activation-induced cell death of T cells; negative regulation of extrinsic apoptotic signaling pathway via death domain receptors; positive regulation of interferon-gamma production; positive regulation of CD8-positive, alpha-beta cytotoxic T cell extravasation; lymph node development; T cell homeostasis; response to cocaine; response to morphine; behavioral response to cocaine; regulation of necroptotic process; positive regulation of apoptotic process; toll-like receptor 3 signaling pathway; kidney development
Sources:Amigo / QuickGO
Orthologs
Databases	NCBI: entry; OMA: entry
Species	Human	Mouse
Entrez	8772	14082
Ensembl	ENSG00000168040	ENSMUSG00000031077
UniProt	Q13158	Q61160
RefSeq (mRNA)	NM_003824	NM_010175
RefSeq (protein)	NP_003815	NP_034305
Location (UCSC)	Chr 11: 70.2 – 70.21 Mb	n/a
PubMed search
- Wikidata
View/Edit Human	View/Edit Mouse

FAS-associated death domain protein, also called MORT1, is encoded by the FADD gene on the 11q13.3 region of chromosome 11 in humans.

FADD is an adaptor protein that bridges members of the tumor necrosis factor receptor superfamily, such as the Fas-receptor, to procaspases 8 and 10 to form the death-inducing signaling complex (DISC) during apoptosis. As well as its most well known role in apoptosis, FADD has also been seen to play a role in other processes including proliferation, cell cycle regulation and development.

== Structure ==
FADD is a 23 kDa protein, made up of 208 amino acids. It contains two main domains: a C terminal death domain (DD) and an N terminal death effector domain (DED). Each domain, although sharing very little sequence similarity, are structurally similar to one another, with each consisting of 6 α helices. The DD of FADD binds to receptors such as the Fas receptor at the plasma membrane via their DD. The interaction between the death domains are electrostatic interactions involving α helices 2 and 3 of the 6 helix domain. The DED binds to the DED of intracellular molecules such as procaspase 8. It is thought that this interaction occurs through hydrophobic interactions.

== Functions ==
=== Extrinsic apoptosis ===
Upon stimulation by the Fas ligand, the Fas receptor trimerises. Many receptors, including Fas, contain a cytoplasmic DD and are therefore named death receptors. FADD binds to the DD of this trimeric structure via its death domain, resulting in unmasking of FADD's DED and subsequent recruitment of procaspase 8 and 10 via an interaction between the DEDs of both FADD and the procaspases. This generates a complex known as the death inducing signalling complex (DISC). Procaspase 8 and 10 are known as initiator caspases. These are inactive molecules, but when bought into close proximity with other procaspases of the same type, autocatalytic cleavage occurs at an aspartate residue within their own structures, resulting in an activated protein. This activated protein can then go on to cleave and activate further caspases, initiating the caspase cascade. The activated caspases can go on to cleave intracellular proteins such as inhibitor of caspase-activated DNase (ICAD), which ultimately leads to apoptosis of the cell.

Binding of TRAIL to death receptors four and five (DR4 and DR5) can lead to apoptosis by the same mechanism.

Apoptosis can also be triggered by binding of a ligand to tumor necrosis factor receptor 1 (TNFR1); however, the mechanism by which this occurs is slightly more complex. Another DD-containing adaptor protein named TRADD, along with other proteins, binds to activated TNF1R, forming what is known as complex I. This results in activation of the NFκB pathway, which promotes cell survival. This complex is then internalised, and FADD binds to TRADD via an interaction of the DD's of the two adapter proteins, forming what is known as complex II. FADD again recruits procaspase 8, which initiates the caspase cascade leading to apoptosis.

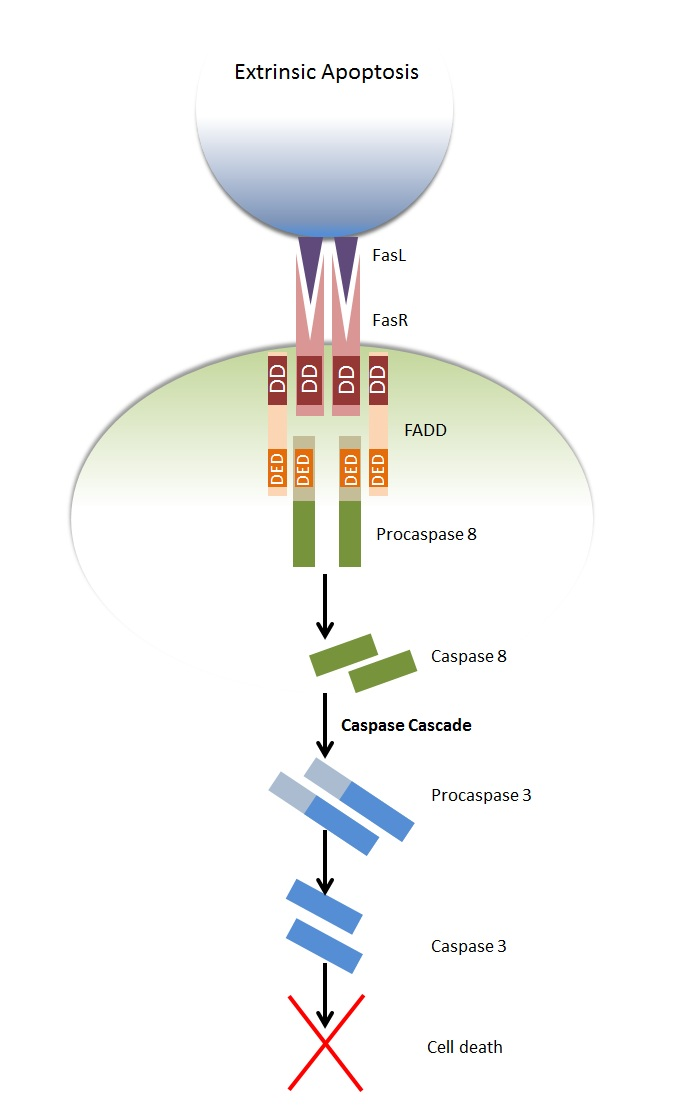
Extrinsic apoptosis pathway: The Fas receptor (FasR) is stimulated by Fas ligand (FasL), recruiting FADD to the FasR via an interaction between the death domains (DD) of both molecules. Procaspase 8 is recruited to FADD and interacts via the death effector domains (DED) of both molecules. This results in the cleavage and activation of procaspase 8, forming caspase 8, which goes on to cleave and activate other caspases such as procaspase 3 to initiate the caspase cascade which leads to cell death.

=== Necroptosis ===
FADD also plays a role in regulating necroptosis, a process requiring the serine/threonine kinases RIPK1 and RIPK3. Activated caspase 8 cleaves these kinases, inhibiting necroptosis. Since activation of caspase 8 requires FADD in order to bring the procaspase 8 molecules into close proximity to one another to facilitate their activation, FADD is required for negatively regulating necroptosis. In accordance, cells deficient in FADD induce necroptosis as they are unable to recruit and activate procaspase 8. FADD can also bind to RIPK1 and RIPK3 directly, however the significance of this interaction is currently unclear.

=== Autophagic cell death ===
Autophagy is a process which allows cell survival under stressed conditions but can also lead to cell death.

Using its DD, FADD interacts with ATG5, a protein involved in autophagy. This interaction has been shown to be essential for autophagic cell death, which is induced by IFN-γ.

In contrast, it has also been found to inhibit autophagic cell death and therefore promote cell survival. FADD binds to ATG5 in a complex which also contains ATG12, Caspase 8 and RIPK1. The formation of this complex is stimulated by autophagic signalling. Caspase 8 then cleaves RIPK1, leading to inhibition of this signalling, inhibiting cell death.

=== Development ===
FADD knockout in mouse embryos is lethal, showing a role for FADD in embryonic development. This is thought to be due to abnormal development of the heart. This abnormal heart development may be due to FADD dependent regulation of the NFκB pathway.

FADD also plays a role in the development of the eyes of zebrafish.

=== Cell cycle regulation ===
FADD is thought to have a role in regulating the cell cycle of T lymphocytes. This regulation is dependent on phosphorylation of FADD on Serine 194, which is carried out by Casein Kinase 1a (CKIα). This phosphorylated form of FADD is found mainly in the nucleus and the abundance of phosphorylated FADD increases significantly in the G2 phase of the cell cycle compared to the G1 phase where only very little can be detected. As it is found at the mitotic spindle during G2, it has been proposed to mediate the G2/M transition, however, the mechanism by which it does this it not yet known.

=== Lymphocyte proliferation ===
FADD is essential for T cell proliferation when the T cell receptor is stimulated by antigen. In contrast, FADD has no effect on the proliferation of B cells induced by stimulation of the B cell receptor. However, it is required for B cell proliferation induced by stimulation of TLR3 and TLR4.

=== Inflammation ===
Activation of nuclear factor kappa B (NFκB) signalling leads to transcription of various proinflammatory cytokines as well as anti-apoptotic genes. It was found that NFκB signalling was inhibited in FADD-deficient cells after stimulation of the TNF-R1 or Fas receptors. This suggests a role of FADD in activation of the NFκB pathway. Conversely, FADD also has a role in inhibition of this pathway. Normally, upon stimulation of the receptors TL4 or IL-1R1, the adaptor protein, MyD88, is recruited to the plasma membrane where is binds to IL-1 receptor associated Kinase (IRAK) via a DD-DD interaction. This activates a signalling pathway which results in translocation of NFκB to the nucleus, where it induces the transcription of the inflammatory cytokines. FADD can interfere with the interaction between MyD88 and IRAK, by binding to MyD88 via its DD and therefore this disrupts the cascade which would lead to NFκB translocation and inflammation.

=== Other ===
FADD is required for an efficient antiviral response. Upon viral infection, FADD is needed to increase the levels of Irf7 a molecule which is needed for the production of IFN-α. IFN-α is a key molecule involved in the response against viruses.

FADD is involved in the activation of the phosphatases which dephosphorylate and deactivate Protein Kinase C (PKC). Without FADD, PKC remains active and is able to continue signalling cascades leading to processes including cytoskeletal rearrangements and cell motility.

Recent research has also shown that it may have a role in regulating glucose levels and the phosphorylated form of FADD is important for this function.

== Regulation ==
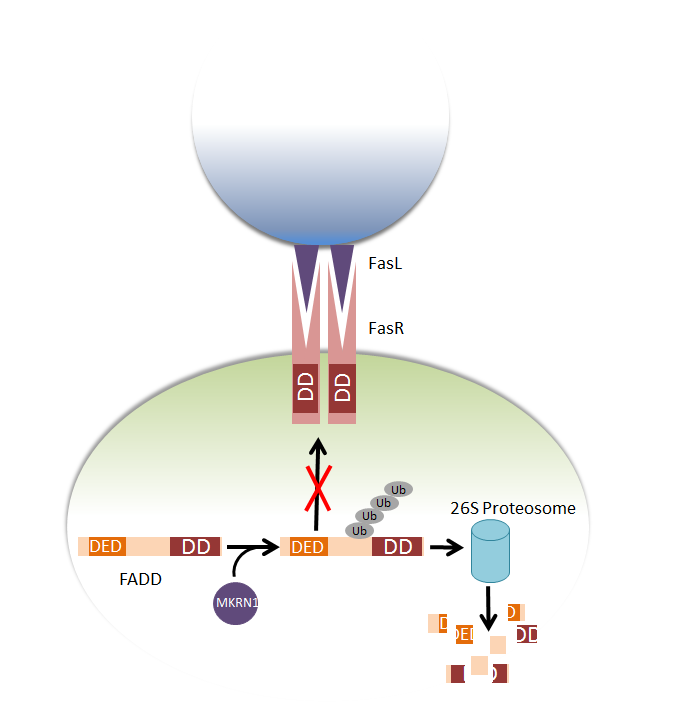
Regulation of FADD by MKRN1: MKRN1 ubiquitinylates FADD targeting it for degradation by the 26S proteosome. As it is degraded, FADD can no longer bind to the Fas receptor (Fas R) to induce apoptosis.

=== Subcellular localisation ===
FADD can be found in both the nucleus and cytoplasm of cells. Phosphorylation of Ser194 of FADD in humans (or Ser191 in mice) is thought to regulate its subcellular localisation. A nuclear localization sequence and nuclear export signal, both located in the DED of FADD, are also required for it to enter and exit the nucleus. Depending on its subcellular localisation, FADD can have different roles. In the cytoplasm, its main function is to induce apoptosis. However, in the nucleus, it can have the opposite effect and instead promote survival.

=== c-FLIP ===
Cellular FLICE inhibitory protein (c-FLIP) is a regulatory protein which contains two DEDs. There are two isoforms of C-FLIP: C-FLIP_{S} and FLIP_{L}. It was originally thought to act as a negative regulator of apoptosis by binding to the DED of FADD and therefore preventing procaspase 8 from binding and inhibiting formation of the DISC. However, it has been seen that both c-FLIP and procaspase 8 can be found at the same DISC. Therefore, it has been proposed that the presence of c-FLIP inhibits the close interaction of the procaspases to one another. Without this close proximity, the procaspases cannot be completely cleaved and remain in an inactive state.

=== PKC ===
The activity of protein kinase C has a negative effect on Fas receptor mediated apoptosis. This is because it inhibits the recruitment of FADD to the receptor and so a DISC is not formed. It has been shown that by either increasing or decreasing the amount of PKC in T cells, more or less FADD is recruited to FasR respectively, when the FasR is stimulated.

=== MKRN1 ===
MKRN1 is an E3 ubiquitin ligase which negatively regulates FADD by targeting it for ubiquitin mediated degradation. In doing so, MKRN1 is able to control the level of apoptosis.

== Roles in inflammatory diseases ==
Increased levels of FADD were found in the leukocytes of patients with relapsing remitting multiple sclerosis, contributing to inflammation. In rheumatoid arthritis, it is thought that stimulation of Fas receptors on macrophages, leads to formation of the FADD containing DISCs. Formation of these sequesters FADD away from MyD88 allowing MyD88 to interact with IRAK and induce the enhanced inflammation associated with this disease.

== Roles in cancer ==
As FADD has such an important role in apoptosis, loss of FADD can give cancer cells a proliferative advantage as apoptosis would no longer be induced when the Fas receptors are stimulated.

However, there is significant upregulation of FADD in ovarian cancer and head and neck squamous cell carcinoma. It is not yet clear what advantage this has on the cancer cells, but given FADDs roles in cell cycle regulation and cell survival, it likely that it may be related to this. There are also elevated levels of FADD in non small cell lung cancer. FADD can be used as a prognosis marker for both of these diseases, with high levels of FADD being correlated with poor outcome.

=== Therapeutic target ===
Taxol is a drug used in anticancer therapies due to its ability to interfere with microtubule assembly, which leads to cell cycle arrest. FADD phosphorylated at Ser194 makes cells more sensitive to cell cycle arrest induced by taxol. Taxol can also cause apoptosis of cells and this requires procaspase 10, which is activated by recruitment to FADD.

It has been shown that the activation of JNK leads to the phosphorylation of FADD. Phosphorylated FADD can induce G2/M cell cycle arrest, potentially by increasing the stability of p53. Therefore, drugs which can activate this pathway may have a therapeutic potential. However, high levels of phosphorylated FADD have been correlated with a poor prognosis in many cancers such as that of the head and neck. This is likely to be due to its activation of the NF-κB pathway, which is antiapoptotic. Therefore, inhibition of FADD phosphorylation may be developed as a potential anti cancer strategy. For example, It has been suggested that inhibition of FADD might work as a potential targeted therapy for drug-resistant ovarian cancer.

== Interactions ==
FADD has been seen to interact with Fas receptor,:

- ABCA1,
- ATG5,
- C-FLIP, MKRN1,
- Casein Kinase 1a,
- DEDD,
- MBD4
- MyD88,
- NACA,
- PEA15,
- RIPK1,
- RIPK3,
- TRADD,
- TRAIL,
- procaspase 10, and
- Procaspase 8.

== See also ==
- TRADD
- Intrinsic apoptosis
