= Death receptor 4 =

Protein found in humans

TNFRSF10A

Identifiers
- Aliases: TNFRSF10A, APO2, CD261, DR4, TRAILR-1, TRAILR1, tumor necrosis factor receptor superfamily member 10a, TNF receptor superfamily member 10a
- External IDs: OMIM: 603611; MGI: 1341090; GeneCards: TNFRSF10A

Gene location (Human)
Chr.	Chromosome 8 (human)
Band	8p21.3	Start	23,190,452 bp
Band	8p21.3	End	23,225,102 bp

Gene location (Mouse)
Chr.	Chromosome 14 (mouse)
Band	14|14 D2	Start	70,004,921 bp
Band	14|14 D2	End	70,021,860 bp
RNA expression pattern
Bgee	Human / Mouse (ortholog); Top expressed in: buccal mucosa cell; nipple; pancreatic ductal cell; tendon of biceps brachii; pylorus; lymph node; superficial temporal artery; epithelium of colon; mucosa of pharynx; nasal epithelium / Top expressed in: urethra; female urethra; male urethra; genital tubercle; morula; endothelial cell of lymphatic vessel; tail of embryo; lens; embryo; embryo; More reference expression data
BioGPS	n/a
Gene ontology
Molecular function	TRAIL binding; transcription factor binding; protease binding; protein binding; tumor necrosis factor-activated receptor activity; death receptor activity; signaling receptor activity
Cellular component	membrane; plasma membrane; integral component of plasma membrane; cell surface; intracellular anatomical structure; integral component of membrane
Biological process	activation of NF-kappaB-inducing kinase activity; TRAIL-activated apoptotic signaling pathway; multicellular organism development; cell surface receptor signaling pathway; response to lipopolysaccharide; cellular response to mechanical stimulus; regulation of cell population proliferation; immune response; regulation of extrinsic apoptotic signaling pathway via death domain receptors; inflammatory response; activation of cysteine-type endopeptidase activity involved in apoptotic process; extrinsic apoptotic signaling pathway via death domain receptors; signal transduction; negative regulation of extrinsic apoptotic signaling pathway via death domain receptors; extrinsic apoptotic signaling pathway; tumor necrosis factor-mediated signaling pathway; apoptotic process; leukocyte migration; regulation of apoptotic process; negative regulation of cysteine-type endopeptidase activity involved in apoptotic process; positive regulation of apoptotic process
Sources:Amigo / QuickGO
Orthologs
Databases	NCBI: entry; OMA: entry
Species	Human	Mouse
Entrez	8797	21933
Ensembl	ENSG00000104689	ENSMUSG00000022074
UniProt	O00220	Q9QZM4
RefSeq (mRNA)	NM_003844	NM_020275
RefSeq (protein)	NP_003835	NP_064671
Location (UCSC)	Chr 8: 23.19 – 23.23 Mb	Chr 14: 70 – 70.02 Mb
PubMed search
- Wikidata
View/Edit Human	View/Edit Mouse

Death receptor 4 (DR4), also known as TRAIL receptor 1 (TRAILR1) and tumor necrosis factor receptor superfamily member 10A (TNFRSF10A), is a cell surface receptor of the TNF-receptor superfamily that binds TRAIL and mediates apoptosis.

== Function ==
The protein encoded by this gene is a member of the TNF-receptor superfamily. This receptor is activated by tumor necrosis factor-related apoptosis inducing ligand (TNFSF10/TRAIL), and thus transduces cell death signal and induces cell apoptosis.

Studies with FADD-deficient mice suggested that FADD, a death domain containing adaptor protein, is required for the apoptosis mediated by this protein.

== Interactions ==
TNFRSF10A has been shown to interact with DAP3.
