= Carbonic anhydrase-related protein 11 =

Protein-coding gene in humans

CA11
Available structures
PDB	Ortholog search: PDBe RCSB
PDB	List of PDB id codes 2W2J

Identifiers
- Aliases: CA11, CARPX1, carbonic anhydrase 11, CA-RP II, CA-RP, CARP-2, CA-XI
- External IDs: OMIM: 604644; MGI: 1336193; HomoloGene: 36061; GeneCards: CA11; OMA:CA11 - orthologs

Gene location (Human)
Chr.	Chromosome 19 (human)
Band	19q13.33	Start	48,637,946 bp
Band	19q13.33	End	48,646,187 bp

Gene location (Mouse)
Chr.	Chromosome 7 (mouse)
Band	7|7 B3	Start	45,349,267 bp
Band	7|7 B3	End	45,354,106 bp
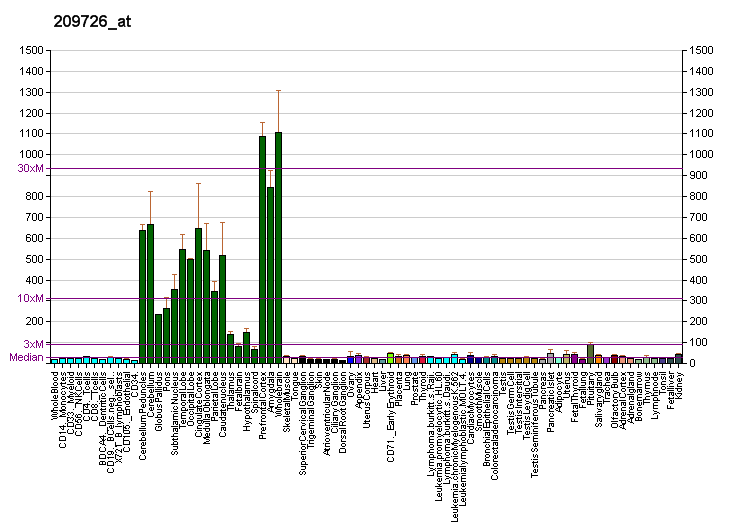
RNA expression pattern
Bgee	Human / Mouse (ortholog); Top expressed in: right hemisphere of cerebellum; right frontal lobe; nucleus accumbens; amygdala; caudate nucleus; dorsolateral prefrontal cortex; Brodmann area 9; prefrontal cortex; cingulate gyrus; anterior cingulate cortex / Top expressed in: superior frontal gyrus; primary visual cortex; olfactory tubercle; nucleus accumbens; dentate gyrus of hippocampal formation granule cell; piriform cortex; globus pallidus; Region I of hippocampus proper; prefrontal cortex; primary motor cortex; More reference expression data
BioGPS	More reference expression data
Orthologs
Species	Human	Mouse
Entrez	770	12348
Ensembl	ENSG00000063180	ENSMUSG00000003273
UniProt	O75493	O70354
RefSeq (mRNA)	NM_001217	NM_009800; NM_001368349
RefSeq (protein)	NP_001208	NP_033930; NP_001355278
Location (UCSC)	Chr 19: 48.64 – 48.65 Mb	Chr 7: 45.35 – 45.35 Mb
PubMed search
- Wikidata
View/Edit Human	View/Edit Mouse

Carbonic anhydrase-related protein 11 is a protein that in humans is encoded by the CA11 gene.

== Function ==
Carbonic anhydrases (CAs) are a large family of zinc metalloenzymes that catalyze the reversible hydration of carbon dioxide. They participate in a variety of biological processes, including respiration, calcification, acid-base balance, bone resorption, and the formation of aqueous humor, cerebrospinal fluid, saliva, and gastric acid. They show extensive diversity in tissue distribution and in their subcellular localization. CA XI is likely a secreted protein, however, radical changes at active site residues completely conserved in CA isozymes with catalytic activity, make it unlikely that it has carbonic anhydrase activity. It shares properties in common with two other acatalytic CA isoforms, CA VIII and CA X. CA XI is most abundantly expressed in brain, and may play a general role in the central nervous system.

== Interactions ==
CA11 has been shown to interact with RIPK1.
