= RIPK3 =

Protein-coding gene in humans

Identifiers
- Aliases: RIPK3, RIP3, receptor interacting serine/threonine kinase 3
- External IDs: OMIM: 605817; MGI: 2154952; GeneCards: RIPK3
Available structures
PDB	Ortholog search: PDBe RCSB
PDB	List of PDB id codes 4M66, 4M69
Enzyme activity
EC #	BRENDA	ExPASy	KEGG	MetaCyc
2.7.11.1	↗	↗	↗	↗

Gene location (Human)
Chr.	Chromosome 14 (human)
Band	14q12	Start	24,336,025 bp
Band	14q12	End	24,340,022 bp

Gene location (Mouse)
Chr.	Chromosome 14 (mouse)
Band	14|14 C3	Start	56,022,452 bp
Band	14|14 C3	End	56,026,322 bp
RNA expression pattern
Bgee	Human / Mouse (ortholog); Top expressed in: granulocyte; mucosa of transverse colon; blood; duodenum; spleen; rectum; appendix; monocyte; right lobe of thyroid gland; lymph node / Top expressed in: endothelial cell of lymphatic vessel; yolk sac; thymus; Paneth cell; internal carotid artery; cartilage organ; dermis; epithelium of small intestine; external carotid artery; embryo; More reference expression data
BioGPS	n/a
Gene ontology
Molecular function	transferase activity; protein kinase activity; nucleotide binding; transcription coactivator activity; kinase activity; protein serine/threonine kinase activity; NF-kappaB-inducing kinase activity; protein binding; identical protein binding; ATP binding; protein-containing complex binding
Cellular component	cytoplasm; cytosol; membrane; plasma membrane; intracellular anatomical structure; mitochondrion
Biological process	regulation of CD8-positive, alpha-beta cytotoxic T cell extravasation; amyloid fibril formation; T cell differentiation in thymus; protein heterooligomerization; phosphorylation; thymus development; regulation of interferon-gamma production; positive regulation of oxidoreductase activity; regulation of adaptive immune response; spleen development; regulation of reactive oxygen species metabolic process; regulation of activation-induced cell death of T cells; T cell homeostasis; positive regulation of phosphatase activity; positive regulation of necroptotic process; protein phosphorylation; regulation of activated T cell proliferation; positive regulation of reactive oxygen species metabolic process; NIK/NF-kappaB signaling; positive regulation of NF-kappaB transcription factor activity; apoptotic signaling pathway; protein autophosphorylation; positive regulation of ligase activity; necroptosis; regulation of T cell mediated cytotoxicity; I-kappaB kinase/NF-kappaB signaling; lymph node development; protein homooligomerization; activation of protein kinase activity; positive regulation of intrinsic apoptotic signaling pathway; signal transduction; programmed cell death; positive regulation of necrotic cell death; positive regulation of nucleic acid-templated transcription; cellular response to hydrogen peroxide; programmed necrotic cell death
Sources:Amigo / QuickGO
Orthologs
Databases	NCBI: entry; OMA: entry
Species	Human	Mouse
Entrez	11035	56532
Ensembl	ENSG00000129465; ENSG00000285379	ENSMUSG00000022221
UniProt	Q9Y572	Q9QZL0
RefSeq (mRNA)	NM_006871	NM_001164107; NM_001164108; NM_019955
RefSeq (protein)	NP_006862	NP_001157579; NP_001157580; NP_064339
Location (UCSC)	Chr 14: 24.34 – 24.34 Mb	Chr 14: 56.02 – 56.03 Mb
PubMed search
- Wikidata
View/Edit Human	View/Edit Mouse

Receptor-interacting serine/threonine-protein kinase 3 is an enzyme that is encoded by the RIPK3 gene in humans.

The product of this gene is a member of the receptor-interacting protein (RIP) family of serine/threonine protein kinases. It contains a C-terminal domain unique from other RIP family members. The encoded protein is predominantly localized to the cytoplasm, and can undergo nucleocytoplasmic shuttling dependent on novel nuclear localization and export signals. It is a component of the tumor necrosis factor (TNF) receptor-I signaling complex, and can induce necroptosis by interaction with RIPK1 and MLKL in a protein complex termed the necrosome. Interactions between RIPK1 and RIPK3 also form a necrosome, which triggers apoptosis.

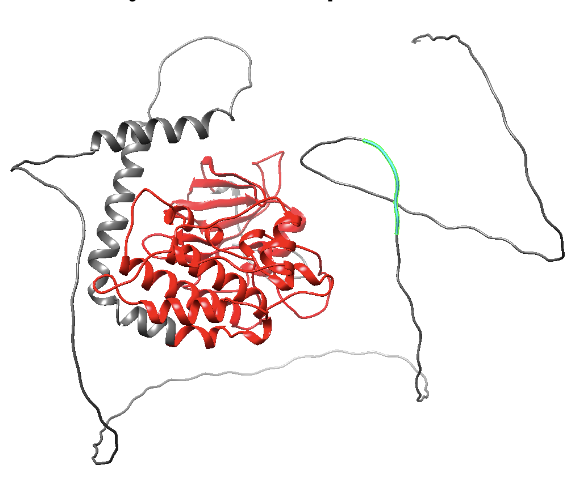
The red highlighted region of RIPK3 represents the Protein Kinase domain. The cyan region highlights the RIP homotypic interaction motif (RHIM) motif.

== Interactions ==
RIPK3 has been shown to interact with RIPK1 to form an amyloid spine The RIP Homotypic Interaction Motifs (RHIM) of RIPK3 allows it to form a necrosome with RIPK1. This interaction makes heterotypic β sheets, which bind together to form an alternating "ladder" of Serine from RIPK1 and Cysteine from RIPK3.

== Clinical significance ==
RIPK3 is believed to contribute to lung inflammation and injury during severe infections with the influenza A virus. The experimental RIPK3 inhibitor UH15-38 has shown potential in preclinical studies to reduce mortality and lung damage in mice infected with influenza, indicating that RIPK3 may serve as a therapeutic target for managing hyper-inflammatory conditions such as influenza-related acute respiratory distress syndrome (ARDS).
