= CFLAR =

Protein-coding gene in humans

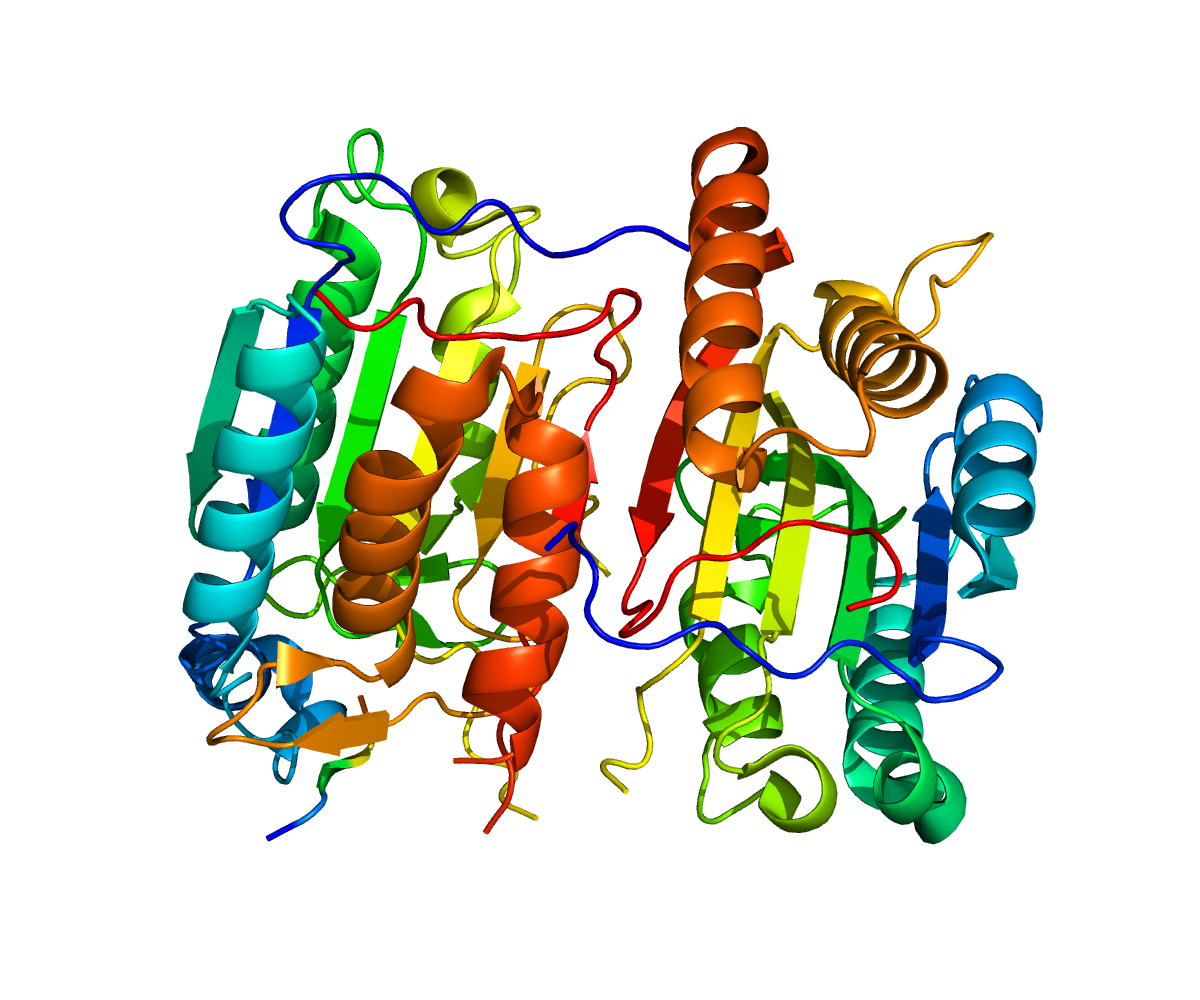

Identifiers
- Aliases: CFLAR, CASH, CASP8AP1, CLARP, Casper, FLAME, FLAME-1, FLAME1, FLIP, I-FLICE, MRIT, c-FLIP, c-FLIPL, c-FLIPR, c-FLIPS, CASP8 and FADD like apoptosis regulator, cFLIP
- External IDs: OMIM: 603599; MGI: 1336166; GeneCards: CFLAR
Available structures
PDB	Ortholog search: PDBe RCSB
PDB	List of PDB id codes 3H11, 3H13, 2N5R

Gene location (Human)
Chr.	Chromosome 2 (human)
Band	2q33.1	Start	201,116,154 bp
Band	2q33.1	End	201,176,687 bp

Gene location (Mouse)
Chr.	Chromosome 1 (mouse)
Band	1 C1.3|1 29.16 cM	Start	58,750,667 bp
Band	1 C1.3|1 29.16 cM	End	58,798,043 bp
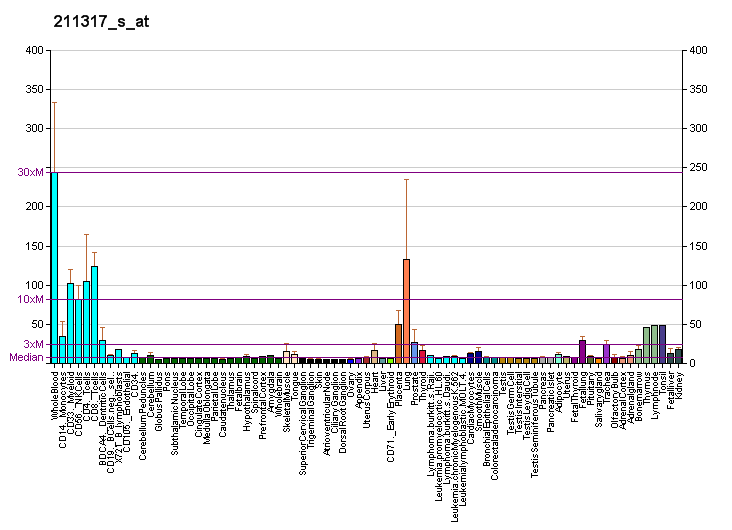

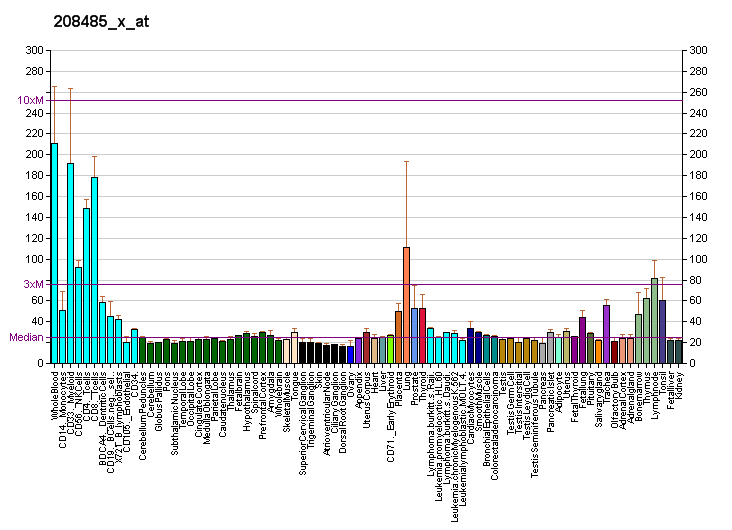

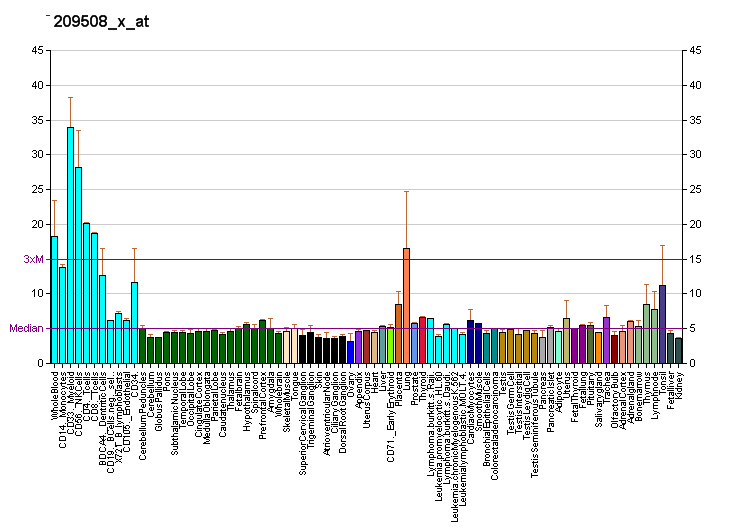
RNA expression pattern
Bgee	Human / Mouse (ortholog); Top expressed in: right lung; apex of heart; upper lobe of left lung; right auricle of heart; left ventricle; epithelium of colon; blood; granulocyte; gastrocnemius muscle; bone marrow cell / Top expressed in: granulocyte; right kidney; ascending aorta; aortic valve; proximal tubule; right lung; right lung lobe; ciliary body; thymus; lateral recess; More reference expression data
BioGPS	More reference expression data
Gene ontology
Molecular function	cysteine-type peptidase activity; protein binding; cysteine-type endopeptidase activity involved in execution phase of apoptosis; enzyme activator activity; cysteine-type endopeptidase activity; peptidase activator activity; protein heterodimerization activity; protease binding; death receptor binding; protein-containing complex binding; cysteine-type endopeptidase activity involved in apoptotic process
Cellular component	cytosol; CD95 death-inducing signaling complex; ripoptosome; death-inducing signaling complex; membrane raft; cytoplasm
Biological process	regulation of apoptotic process; execution phase of apoptosis; negative regulation of apoptotic process; proteolysis; positive regulation of I-kappaB kinase/NF-kappaB signaling; regulation of necroptotic process; regulation of extrinsic apoptotic signaling pathway via death domain receptors; viral process; apoptotic process; positive regulation of catalytic activity; response to hypoxia; negative regulation of cardiac muscle cell apoptotic process; positive regulation of neuron projection development; cellular response to insulin stimulus; response to testosterone; positive regulation of ERK1 and ERK2 cascade; cellular response to epidermal growth factor stimulus; cellular response to estradiol stimulus; cellular response to hypoxia; cellular response to dexamethasone stimulus; cellular response to nitric oxide; positive regulation of glomerular mesangial cell proliferation; positive regulation of extracellular matrix organization; negative regulation of reactive oxygen species biosynthetic process; negative regulation of cellular response to transforming growth factor beta stimulus; negative regulation of hepatocyte apoptotic process; negative regulation of epithelial cell apoptotic process; positive regulation of hepatocyte proliferation; negative regulation of extrinsic apoptotic signaling pathway via death domain receptors; skeletal muscle tissue development; positive regulation of peptidase activity; skeletal muscle atrophy; regulation of skeletal muscle satellite cell proliferation; skeletal myofibril assembly; negative regulation of cysteine-type endopeptidase activity involved in apoptotic process; skeletal muscle tissue regeneration; positive regulation of NF-kappaB transcription factor activity; negative regulation of necroptotic process; negative regulation of myoblast fusion; negative regulation of extrinsic apoptotic signaling pathway; response to bacterium
Sources:Amigo / QuickGO
Orthologs
Databases	NCBI: entry; OMA: entry
Species	Human	Mouse
Entrez	8837	12633
Ensembl	ENSG00000003402	ENSMUSG00000026031
UniProt	O15519	O35732
RefSeq (mRNA)	NM_001127183; NM_001127184; NM_001202515; NM_001202516; NM_001202517 NM_001202518; NM_001202519; NM_001308042; NM_001308043; NM_003879; NM_001351590; NM_001351591; NM_001351592; NM_001351593; NM_001351594	NM_001289704; NM_001293804; NM_001293805; NM_009805; NM_207653 NM_001355056
RefSeq (protein)	NP_001120655; NP_001120656; NP_001189444; NP_001189445; NP_001189446 NP_001189447; NP_001189448; NP_001294971; NP_001294972; NP_003870; NP_001338519; NP_001338520; NP_001338521; NP_001338522; NP_001338523	NP_001276633; NP_001280733; NP_001280734; NP_033935; NP_997536 NP_001341985
Location (UCSC)	Chr 2: 201.12 – 201.18 Mb	Chr 1: 58.75 – 58.8 Mb
PubMed search
- Wikidata
View/Edit Human	View/Edit Mouse

CASP8 and FADD-like apoptosis regulator, also called c-FLIP (FLICE-like inhibitory protein), is a protein that in humans is encoded by the CFLAR gene.

== See also ==
- CASP8
- FADD
