= Xevinapant =

Chemical compound

Clinical data
- Other names: AT 406; Debio-1143

Legal status
- Legal status: Investigational

Identifiers
- IUPAC name: (5S,8S,10aR)-N-benzhydryl-5-[[(2S)-2-(methylamino)propanoyl]amino]-3-(3-methylbutanoyl)-6-oxo-1,2,4,5,8,9,10,10a-octahydropyrrolo[1,2-a][1,5]diazocine-8-carboxamide
- CAS Number: 1071992-99-8
- PubChem CID: 25022340
- DrugBank: DB16305
- ChemSpider: 28424114
- UNII: N65WC8PXDD
- KEGG: D12565
- ChEMBL: ChEMBL2158051
- CompTox Dashboard (EPA): DTXSID50648496

Chemical and physical data
- Formula: C_{32}H_{43}N_{5}O_{4}
- Molar mass: 561.727 g·mol^{−1}
- 3D model (JSmol): Interactive image
- SMILES: C[C@@H](C(=O)N[C@H]1CN(CC[C@H]2CC[C@H](N2C1=O)C(=O)NC(C3=CC=CC=C3)C4=CC=CC=C4)C(=O)CC(C)C)NC
- InChI: InChI=1S/C32H43N5O4/c1-21(2)19-28(38)36-18-17-25-15-16-27(37(25)32(41)26(20-36)34-30(39)22(3)33-4)31(40)35-29(23-11-7-5-8-12-23)24-13-9-6-10-14-24/h5-14,21-22,25-27,29,33H,15-20H2,1-4H3,(H,34,39)(H,35,40)/t22-,25+,26-,27-/m0/s1; Key:LSXUTRRVVSPWDZ-MKKUMYSQSA-N

Xevinapant is an investigational new drug that is being evaluated to treat squamous cell cancer. By acting as a SMAC mimetic, it functions as an inhibitor of several members of the IAP protein family (including XIAP, c-IAP1, and c-IAP2).
