= Inhibitor of apoptosis domain =

Inhibitor of Apoptosis domain
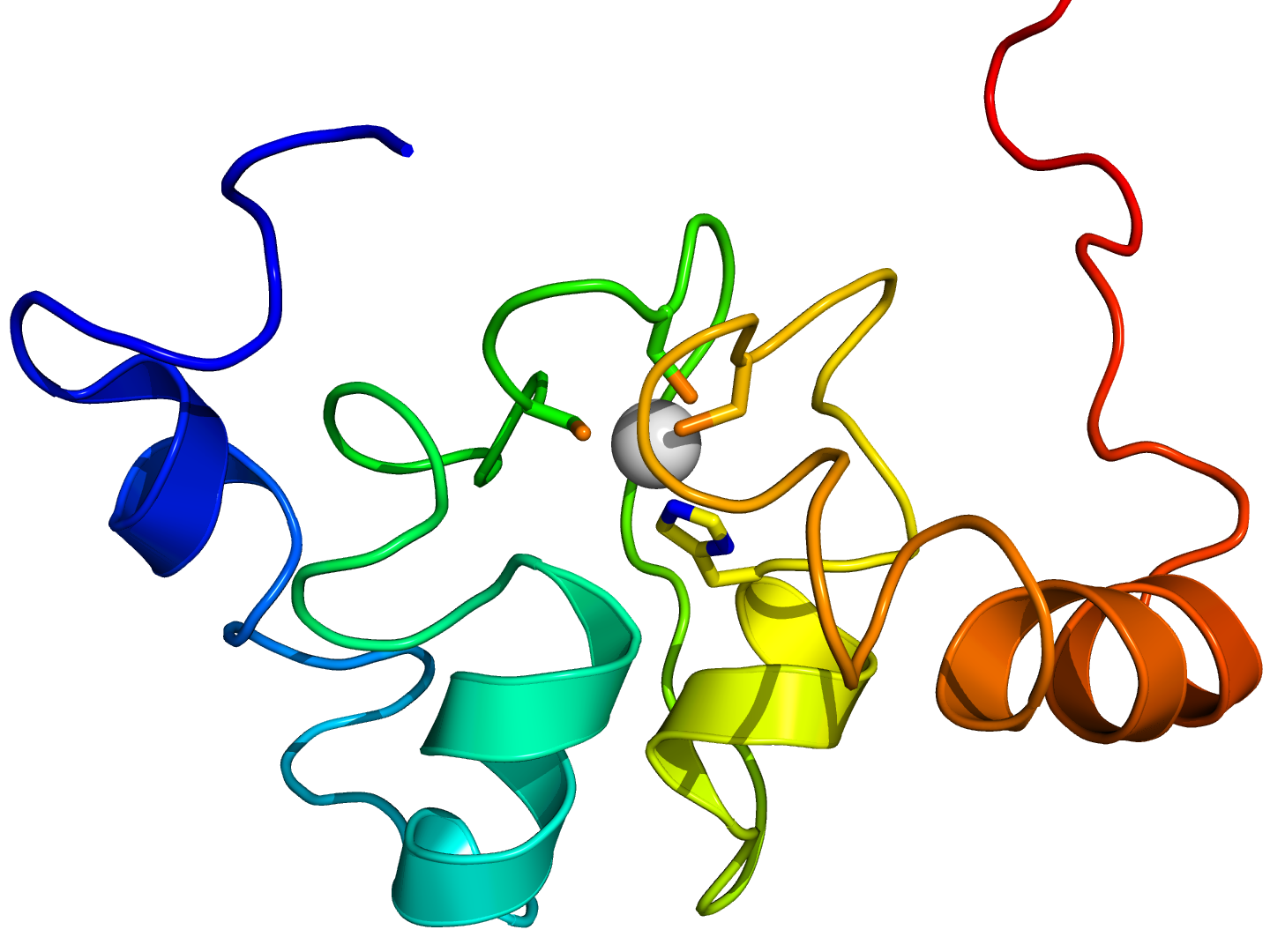
- NMR solution structure of the BIR domain of human BIRC2 protein. The protein is rainbow colored cartoon diagram (N-terminus = blue, C-terminus = red) while the coordinated zinc is represented by a grey sphere.

Identifiers
- Symbol: BIR
- Pfam: PF00653
- InterPro: IPR001370
- PROSITE: PS50143
- SCOP2: 1qbh / SCOPe / SUPFAM
Available protein structures:
- PDB: 1c9q, 1e31, 1f3h, 1f9x, 1g3f, 1g73, 1i3o, 1jd4, 1jd5, 1jd6, 1m4m, 1nw9, 1oxn, 1oxq, 1oy7, 1q4q, 1qbh, 1sdz, 1se0, 1tfq, 1tft, 1tw6, 1xb0, 1xb1, 1xox, 2i3h, 2i3i IPR001370 PF00653 (ECOD; PDBsum)
- AlphaFold: IPR001370; PF00653

The inhibitor of apoptosis domain, also known as IAP repeat, Baculovirus Inhibitor of apoptosis protein Repeat, or BIR, is a structural motif found in proteins with roles in apoptosis, cytokine production, and chromosome segregation. Proteins containing BIR are known as inhibitor of apoptosis proteins (IAPs), or BIR-containing proteins (BIRPs or BIRCs), and include BIRC1 (NAIP), BIRC2 (cIAP1), BIRC3 (cIAP2), BIRC4 (xIAP), BIRC5 (survivin) and BIRC6.

BIR domains belong to the zinc-finger domain family and characteristically have a number of invariant amino acid residues, including 3 conserved cysteines and one conserved histidine, which coordinate a zinc ion. They are typically composed of 4-5 alpha helices and a three-stranded beta sheet.
