= GHITM =

Protein-coding gene in the species Homo sapiens

Identifiers
- Aliases: GHITM, DERP2, HSPC282, MICS1, PTD010, TMBIM5, My021, growth hormone inducible transmembrane protein
- External IDs: MGI: 1913342; HomoloGene: 8667; GeneCards: GHITM; OMA:GHITM - orthologs

Gene location (Human)
Chr.	Chromosome 10 (human)
Band	10q23.1	Start	84,139,482 bp
Band	10q23.1	End	84,154,841 bp

Gene location (Mouse)
Chr.	Chromosome 14 (mouse)
Band	14 B|14 21.29 cM	Start	36,842,049 bp
Band	14 B|14 21.29 cM	End	36,857,229 bp
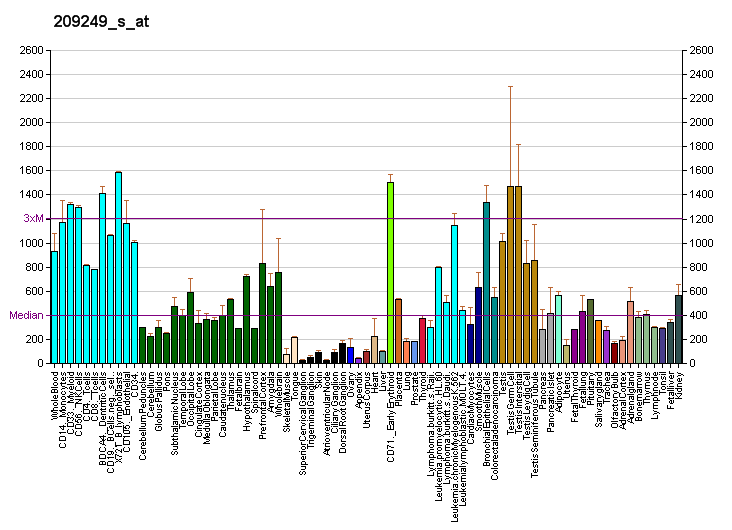

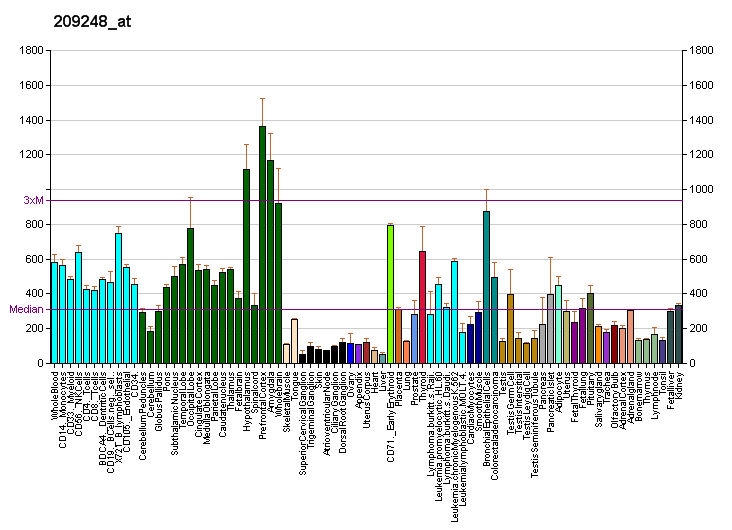
RNA expression pattern
Bgee	Human / Mouse (ortholog); Top expressed in: sperm; right ventricle; myocardium of left ventricle; mucosa of ileum; deltoid muscle; tibialis anterior muscle; mucosa of colon; lateral nuclear group of thalamus; mucosa of sigmoid colon; Skeletal muscle tissue of rectus abdominis / Top expressed in: blood; right kidney; cerebellar cortex; medial vestibular nucleus; brown adipose tissue; muscle of thigh; pontine nuclei; neural layer of retina; superior frontal gyrus; deep cerebellar nuclei; More reference expression data
BioGPS	More reference expression data
Gene ontology
Molecular function	protein binding; molecular function
Cellular component	extracellular exosome; membrane; integral component of membrane; mitochondrial inner membrane; mitochondrion
Biological process	apoptotic process; biological process
Sources:Amigo / QuickGO
Orthologs
Species	Human	Mouse
Entrez	27069	66092
Ensembl	ENSG00000165678	ENSMUSG00000041028
UniProt	Q9H3K2	Q91VC9
RefSeq (mRNA)	NM_014394	NM_001199122; NM_078478; NM_001359902
RefSeq (protein)	NP_055209	NP_001186051; NP_510963; NP_001346831
Location (UCSC)	Chr 10: 84.14 – 84.15 Mb	Chr 14: 36.84 – 36.86 Mb
PubMed search
- Wikidata
View/Edit Human	View/Edit Mouse

Growth hormone-inducible transmembrane protein (GHITM), also known as transmembrane BAX inhibitor motif containing protein 5 (TMBIM5), is a protein that in humans is encoded by the GHITM gene on chromosome 10. It is a member of the BAX inhibitor motif containing (TMBIM) family and localizes to the inner mitochondrial membrane (IMM), as well as the endoplasmic reticulum (ER), where it plays a role in apoptosis through mediating mitochondrial morphology and cytochrome c release. Through its apoptotic function, GHITM may be involved in tumor metastasis and innate antiviral responses.

== Structure ==
This gene encodes a 37 kDa protein which putatively contains six to eight transmembrane domains. As a member of the TMBIM family, GHITM shares a transmembrane BAX inhibitor motif, a semi-hydrophobic transmembrane domain, and similar tertiary structure with the other five members. However, unlike the other members, GHITM possesses a unique acidic (D) instead of a basic (H or R) residue near its second transmembrane domain, as well as an additional transmembrane domain that, after cleavage behind residue 57 (SREY|A), signals for localization to the IMM. Nonetheless, it is possible that cleavage at different sites (XXRR-like motif (LAAR) in the N-terminal and a KKXX-like motif (GNRK) in the C-terminal) or alternative splicing may account for the protein’s observed localization to the ER.

== Function ==
GHITM is a mitochondrial protein and a member of the TMBIM family and BAX inhibitor-1 (BI1) superfamily. It is ubiquitously expressed but is especially abundant in the brain, heart, liver, kidney, and skeletal muscle and scarce in the intestines and thymus. This protein localizes specifically to the IMM, where it regulates apoptosis through two separate processes: (1) the BAX-independent management of mitochondrial morphology and (2) the release of cytochrome c. In the first process, GHITM maintains cristae organization, and its downregulation results in mitochondrial fragmentation, possibly through inducing fusing of the cristae structures, thus leading to the release of proapoptotic proteins such as cytochrome c, Smac, and Htra2. Meanwhile, in the second process, GHITM is responsible for cross-linking cytochrome c to the IMM, and upregulation of GHITM is associated with delayed cytochrome c release, regardless of outer mitochondrial membrane permeabilization. Thus, GHITM controls the release of cytochrome c from the mitochondria and can potentially interfere with the apoptotic process to promote cell survival. Moreover, GHITM may further plays a role in apoptosis through maintaining calcium ion homeostasis in the ER. However, while overexpression of the other TMBIM proteins exhibit antiapoptotic effects by decreasing calcium ion concentrations, and thus preventing mitochondrial calcium ion overload, depolarization, ATP loss, reactive oxygen species production, cytochrome c release, and ultimately, cell death, overexpression of GHITM produces the opposite effect.

== Clinical significance ==
GHITM may be involved in tumor metastasis through its interactions with the Bcl-2 family proteins to regulate apoptosis. Its role as an apoptotic regulator may also associate it with innate antiviral responses. Overexpression of GHITM has also been observed to speed up the ageing process in HIV infected patients.

== Interactions ==
GHITM has been shown to interact with cytochrome c.
