= Htra2 =

Term Htra2 may refer to:

- HtrA2 peptidase, an enzyme class
- HtrA serine peptidase 2, an enzyme that in humans is encoded by the HTRA2 gene
