= TRAF2 =

Protein-coding gene in humans

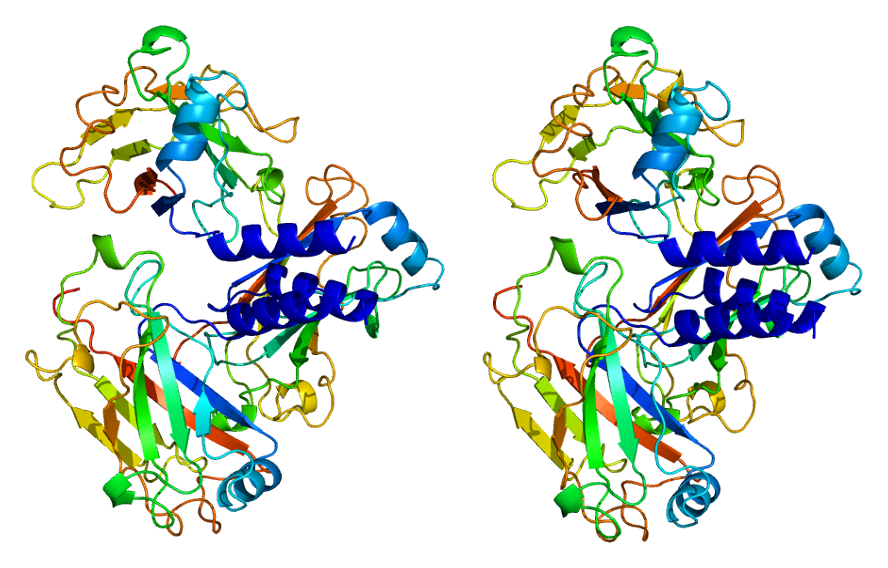

Identifiers
- Aliases: TRAF2, MGC:45012, TRAP, TRAP3, TNF receptor associated factor 2, RNF117
- External IDs: OMIM: 601895; MGI: 101835; GeneCards: TRAF2
Available structures
PDB	Ortholog search: PDBe RCSB
PDB	List of PDB id codes 3M0D, 1CA4, 1CA9, 1CZY, 1CZZ, 1D00, 1D01, 1D0A, 1D0J, 1F3V, 1QSC, 3KNV, 3M06, 3M0A
Enzyme activity
EC #	BRENDA	ExPASy	KEGG	MetaCyc
2.3.2.27	↗	↗	↗	↗

Gene location (Human)
Chr.	Chromosome 9 (human)
Band	9q34.3	Start	136,881,912 bp
Band	9q34.3	End	136,926,607 bp

Gene location (Mouse)
Chr.	Chromosome 2 (mouse)
Band	2|2 A3	Start	25,407,994 bp
Band	2|2 A3	End	25,436,952 bp
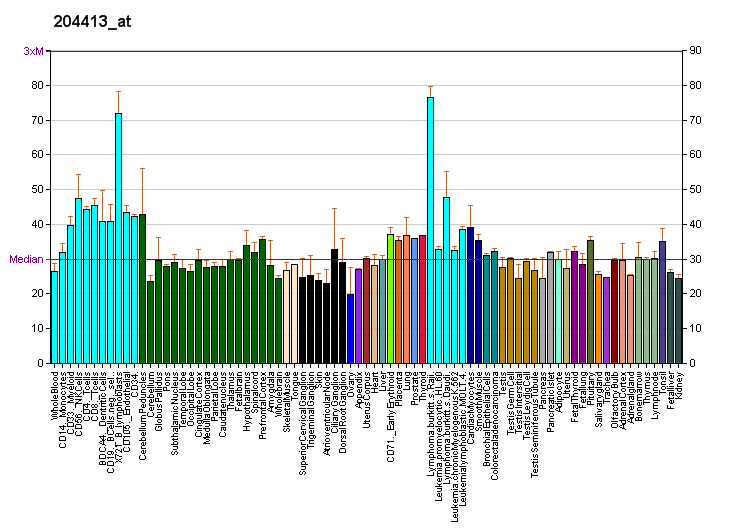
RNA expression pattern
Bgee	Human / Mouse (ortholog); Top expressed in: mucosa of transverse colon; lymph node; right testis; cerebellar hemisphere; right hemisphere of cerebellum; granulocyte; left testis; ganglionic eminence; gonad; spleen / Top expressed in: thymus; granulocyte; mesenteric lymph nodes; lactiferous gland; spermatocyte; crypt of lieberkuhn of small intestine; intestinal villus; spleen; right kidney; ventricular zone; More reference expression data
BioGPS	More reference expression data
Gene ontology
Molecular function	sphingolipid binding; lipid binding; CD40 receptor binding; mitogen-activated protein kinase kinase kinase binding; zinc ion binding; signal transducer activity; metal ion binding; ubiquitin-protein transferase activity; protein binding; identical protein binding; thioesterase binding; enzyme binding; protein phosphatase binding; protein kinase binding; ubiquitin protein ligase binding; transferase activity; tumor necrosis factor receptor binding; protein-containing complex binding
Cellular component	TRAF2-GSTP1 complex; AIP1-IRE1 complex; ubiquitin ligase complex; vesicle membrane; cell cortex; membrane raft; CD40 receptor complex; cytoplasmic side of plasma membrane; IRE1-TRAF2-ASK1 complex; nucleoplasm; cytoplasm; cytosol; protein-containing complex
Biological process	regulation of apoptotic process; positive regulation of tumor necrosis factor-mediated signaling pathway; positive regulation of JUN kinase activity; negative regulation of glial cell apoptotic process; regulation of tumor necrosis factor-mediated signaling pathway; protein K63-linked ubiquitination; positive regulation of DNA-binding transcription factor activity; tumor necrosis factor-mediated signaling pathway; activation of NF-kappaB-inducing kinase activity; positive regulation of protein homodimerization activity; response to endoplasmic reticulum stress; protein homotrimerization; intrinsic apoptotic signaling pathway in response to endoplasmic reticulum stress; positive regulation of I-kappaB phosphorylation; regulation of JNK cascade; protein catabolic process; positive regulation of NF-kappaB transcription factor activity; positive regulation of interleukin-2 production; death-inducing signaling complex assembly; positive regulation of T cell cytokine production; protein ubiquitination; positive regulation of I-kappaB kinase/NF-kappaB signaling; positive regulation of extrinsic apoptotic signaling pathway; cellular response to nitric oxide; regulation of extrinsic apoptotic signaling pathway via death domain receptors; I-kappaB kinase/NF-kappaB signaling; activation of cysteine-type endopeptidase activity involved in apoptotic process; signal transduction; protein autoubiquitination; negative regulation of neuron death; programmed necrotic cell death; apoptotic process; negative regulation of extrinsic apoptotic signaling pathway via death domain receptors; protein deubiquitination; protein heterooligomerization; protein-containing complex assembly
Sources:Amigo / QuickGO
Orthologs
Databases	NCBI: entry; OMA: entry
Species	Human	Mouse
Entrez	7186	22030
Ensembl	ENSG00000127191	ENSMUSG00000026942
UniProt	Q12933	P39429
RefSeq (mRNA)	NM_021138	NM_009422; NM_001290413
RefSeq (protein)	NP_066961	NP_001277342; NP_033448
Location (UCSC)	Chr 9: 136.88 – 136.93 Mb	Chr 2: 25.41 – 25.44 Mb
PubMed search
- Wikidata
View/Edit Human	View/Edit Mouse

TNF receptor-associated factor 2 is a protein that in humans is encoded by the TRAF2 gene.

== Function ==
The protein encoded by this gene is a member of the TNF receptor associated factor (TRAF) protein family. TRAF proteins associate with, and mediate the signal transduction from members of the TNF receptor superfamily. This protein directly interacts with TNF receptors, and forms complexes with other TRAF proteins. TRAF2 is required for TNF-alpha-mediated activation of MAPK8/JNK and NF-κB. The protein complex formed by TRAF2 and TRAF1 interacts with the IAP family members cIAP1 and cIAP2, and functions as a mediator of the anti-apoptotic signals from TNF receptors. The interaction of this protein with TRADD, a TNF receptor associated apoptotic signal transducer, ensures the recruitment of IAPs for the direct inhibition of caspase activation. cIAP1 can ubiquitinate and induce the degradation of this protein, and thus potentiate TNF-induced apoptosis. Multiple alternatively spliced transcript variants have been found for this gene, but the biological validity of only one transcript has been determined.

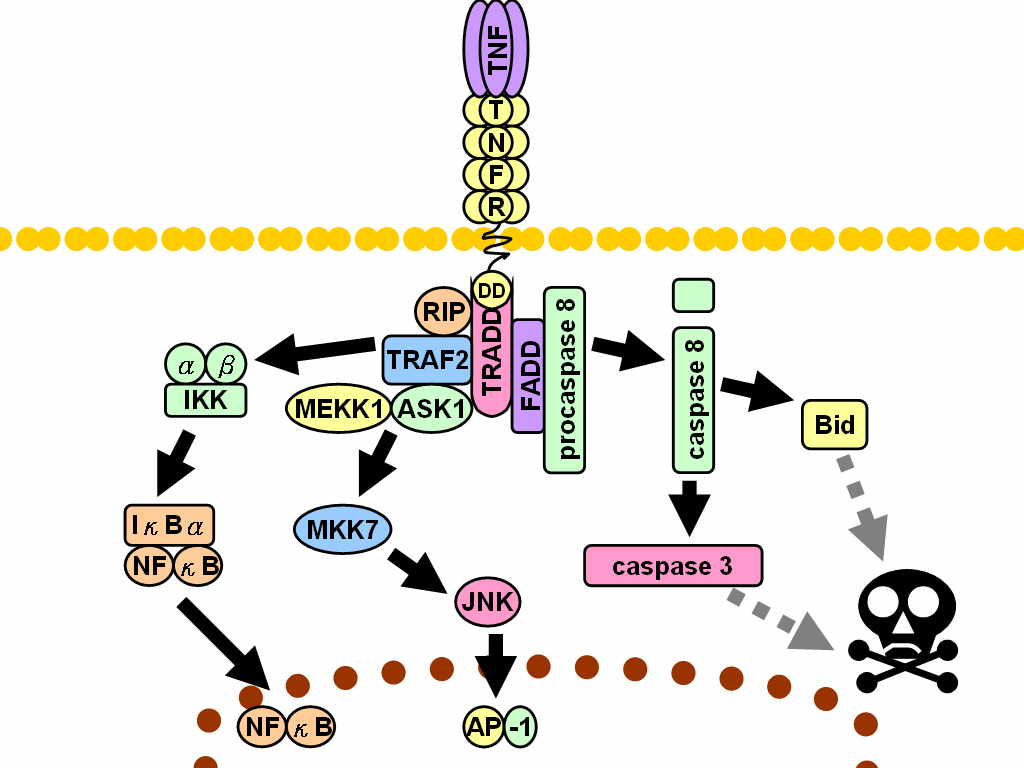
Signaling pathway of TNF-R1. Dashed grey lines represent multiple steps

== Interactions ==
TRAF2 has been shown to interact with:

- ASK1,
- BCL10,
- BIRC2,
- Baculoviral IAP repeat-containing protein 3,
- CASP8AP2,
- CD134,
- CD137,
- CD27,
- CD40,
- CFLAR,
- CHUK,
- Caveolin 1,
- EDARADD,
- HIVEP3,
- IKK2,
- Low affinity nerve growth factor receptor,
- MAP3K14,
- MAP3K1,
- MAP3K7IP2,
- MAP4K2,
- MAP4K5,
- RANK,
- RIPK1,
- SPHK1,
- TANK,
- TANK-binding kinase 1,
- TNFAIP3,
- TNFRSF13B,
- TNFRSF14,
- TNFRSF1A,
- TNFRSF1B,
- TNFSF14,
- TRADD,
- TRAF interacting protein,
- TRAF1, and
- UBE2N.
