= NAIP =

NAIP may refer to:

- NAIP (gene) or NLR family, apoptosis inhibitory protein, a human gene
- National Agriculture Imagery Program of the USDA Farm Service Agency
- North Atlantic Igneous Province, centred on Iceland
