= GCK =

GCK may refer to:

- Government College, Kasaragod, in Kerala, India
- Garden City Regional Airport, in Kansas, United States
- GCK Lions, a Swiss hockey team
- Georges Creek Railway, in Maryland, United States
- Glucokinase, an enzyme encoded by the gene GCK
- MAP4K2, an enzyme
- GC Kompetition, a French motorsport team
