= Emad Alnemri =

Biologist

Emad Saleem Alnemri (Arabic: عماد سليم النمري) is a professor in Biochemistry & Molecular Biology at the Sidney Kimmel Cancer Center, Thomas Jefferson University, researching apoptosis and the inflammasome.

Alnemri's group discovered many of the caspases involved in apoptosis. He also discovered that a mutation in the mitochondrial serine protease Omi causes neurodegeneration.

He studied at the University of Jordan on the "Isolation and characterization of goat tear lysozyme" then received his Ph.D. from the Temple University School of Medicine in 1991, where his thesis was on "Molecular Mechanisms of Glucocorticoid-induced Programmed Cell Death in Lymphoid Tissues", under advisor Gerald Litwack. He has held the Thomas Eakins endowed Professorship since 2009. As of 2011, he had an h-index of 77 and 24,523 citations to his 137 articles. He was an ISI Highly Cited Researcher 2001.
