= TRAF1 =

Protein-coding gene in the species Homo sapiens

Identifiers
- Aliases: TRAF1, EBI6, MGC:10353, TNF receptor associated factor 1
- External IDs: OMIM: 601711; MGI: 101836; GeneCards: TRAF1
Available structures
PDB	Ortholog search: PDBe RCSB
PDB	List of PDB id codes 3M0D

Gene location (Human)
Chr.	Chromosome 9 (human)
Band	9q33.2	Start	120,902,393 bp
Band	9q33.2	End	120,929,173 bp

Gene location (Mouse)
Chr.	Chromosome 2 (mouse)
Band	2|2 B	Start	34,831,762 bp
Band	2|2 B	End	34,851,784 bp
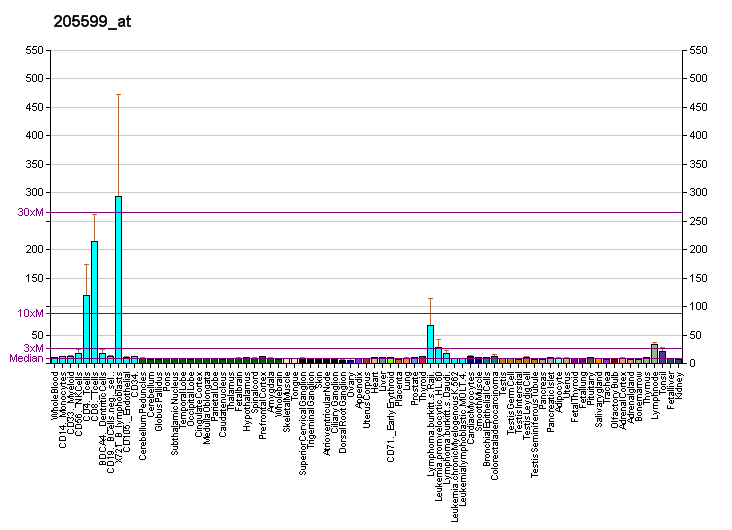
RNA expression pattern
Bgee	Human / Mouse (ortholog); Top expressed in: granulocyte; right coronary artery; Descending thoracic aorta; ascending aorta; lymph node; popliteal artery; tibial arteries; left coronary artery; appendix; tibial nerve / Top expressed in: mesenteric lymph nodes; spleen; membranous bone; Dermatocranium; right lung lobe; mandible; maxilla; thymus; blood; lumbar subsegment of spinal cord; More reference expression data
BioGPS	More reference expression data
Gene ontology
Molecular function	thioesterase binding; zinc ion binding; protein binding; ubiquitin protein ligase binding; identical protein binding; tumor necrosis factor receptor binding
Cellular component	cytoplasm; cytosol; protein-containing complex
Biological process	regulation of apoptotic process; regulation of tumor necrosis factor-mediated signaling pathway; regulation of extrinsic apoptotic signaling pathway; signal transduction; apoptotic process; positive regulation of NF-kappaB transcription factor activity; protein-containing complex assembly
Sources:Amigo / QuickGO
Orthologs
Databases	NCBI: entry; OMA: entry
Species	Human	Mouse
Entrez	7185	22029
Ensembl	ENSG00000056558	ENSMUSG00000026875
UniProt	Q13077	P39428
RefSeq (mRNA)	NM_005658; NM_001190945; NM_001190947	NM_009421; NM_001326601
RefSeq (protein)	NP_001177874; NP_001177876; NP_005649	NP_001313530; NP_033447
Location (UCSC)	Chr 9: 120.9 – 120.93 Mb	Chr 2: 34.83 – 34.85 Mb
PubMed search
- Wikidata
View/Edit Human	View/Edit Mouse

TNF receptor-associated factor 1 is a protein that in humans is encoded by the TRAF1 gene.

== Function ==
The protein encoded by this gene is a member of the TNF receptor (TNFR) associated factor (TRAF) protein family. TRAF proteins associate with, and mediate the signal transduction from various receptors of the TNFR superfamily. This protein and TRAF2 form a heterodimeric complex, which is required for TNF-alpha-mediated activation of MAPK8/JNK and NF-kappaB. The protein complex formed by this protein and TRAF2 also interacts with IAP, and thus mediates the anti-apoptotic signals from TNF receptors. The expression of this protein can be induced by Epstein-Barr virus (EBV). EBV infection membrane protein 1 (LMP1) is found to interact with this and other TRAF proteins; this interaction is thought to link LMP1-mediated B lymphocyte transformation to the signal transduction from TNFR family receptors. TRAF1 also functions as a negative regulator of inflammation by interfering with the linear ubiquitination of NEMO downstream of TLR signaling. This explains why TRAF1 polymorphisms cause an increased risk for rheumatic diseases.

== Interactions ==
TRAF1 has been shown to interact with:

- BIRC2,
- Baculoviral IAP repeat-containing protein 3,
- CFLAR,
- Caspase 8,
- HIVEP3,
- RANK
- TNFAIP3,
- TRAF interacting protein, and
- TRAF2.
- RNF31.
- RBCK1.
- SHARPIN.
