= HIVEP3 =

Protein-coding gene in humans

Identifiers
- Aliases: HIVEP3, Hivep3, 2900056N03Rik, A130075N07, AI848000, E030045D18Rik, KBP-1, KBP1, Rc, Schnurri-3, Shn3, Zas3, ZNF40C, human immunodeficiency virus type I enhancer binding protein 3, Kappa Recognition Component (Krc), KRC, HIVEP zinc finger 3
- External IDs: OMIM: 606649; MGI: 106589; GeneCards: HIVEP3

Gene location (Human)
Chr.	Chromosome 1 (human)
Band	1p34.2	Start	41,506,365 bp
Band	1p34.2	End	42,035,925 bp

Gene location (Mouse)
Chr.	Chromosome 4 (mouse)
Band	4|4 D2.1	Start	119,590,981 bp
Band	4|4 D2.1	End	119,995,242 bp
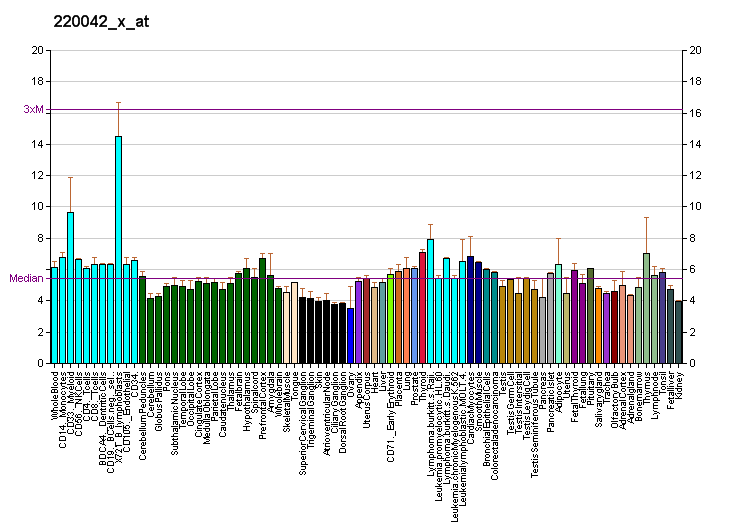
RNA expression pattern
Bgee	Human / Mouse (ortholog); Top expressed in: buccal mucosa cell; endothelial cell; Brodmann area 23; cartilage tissue; parietal pleura; primary visual cortex; granulocyte; middle temporal gyrus; entorhinal cortex; germinal epithelium / Top expressed in: gastrula; medial geniculate nucleus; Rostral migratory stream; subiculum; medial dorsal nucleus; lateral geniculate nucleus; substantia nigra; trigeminal ganglion; anterior amygdaloid area; submandibular gland; More reference expression data
BioGPS	More reference expression data
Gene ontology
Molecular function	DNA-binding transcription factor activity; sequence-specific DNA binding; DNA binding; metal ion binding; nucleic acid binding; DNA-binding transcription factor activity, RNA polymerase II-specific
Cellular component	cytoplasm; nucleus
Biological process	multicellular organism development; skeletal muscle cell differentiation; positive regulation of transcription, DNA-templated; regulation of transcription, DNA-templated; transcription by RNA polymerase II; signal transduction; transcription, DNA-templated; regulation of transcription by RNA polymerase II
Sources:Amigo / QuickGO
Orthologs
Databases	NCBI: entry; OMA: entry
Species	Human	Mouse
Entrez	59269	16656
Ensembl	ENSG00000127124	ENSMUSG00000028634
UniProt	Q5T1R4	A2A884
RefSeq (mRNA)	NM_001127714; NM_024503	NM_010657
RefSeq (protein)	NP_001121186; NP_078779	NP_034787
Location (UCSC)	Chr 1: 41.51 – 42.04 Mb	Chr 4: 119.59 – 120 Mb
PubMed search
- Wikidata
View/Edit Human	View/Edit Mouse

Transcription factor HIVEP3 is a protein that in humans is encoded by the HIVEP3 gene.

== Function ==
Members of the ZAS family, such as ZAS3 (HIVEP3), are large proteins that contain a ZAS domain, a modular protein structure consisting of a pair of C2H2 zinc fingers with an acidic-rich region and a serine/threonine -rich sequence. These proteins bind specific DNA sequences, including the kappa-B motif (GGGACTTTCC), in the promoters and enhancer regions of several genes and viruses, including human immunodeficiency virus (HIV). ZAS genes span more than 150 kb and contain at least 10 exons, one of which is longer than 5.5 kb (Allen and Wu, 2004).[supplied by OMIM]

It regulates osteoblasts.

== Interactions ==
HIVEP3 has been shown to interact with TRAF1 and TRAF2.
