= RIPK2 =

Protein-coding gene in humans

Identifiers
- Aliases: RIPK2, CARD3, CARDIAK, CCK, GIG30, RICK, RIP2, receptor interacting serine/threonine kinase 2
- External IDs: OMIM: 603455; MGI: 1891456; GeneCards: RIPK2
Available structures
PDB	Ortholog search: PDBe RCSB
PDB	List of PDB id codes 4C8B, 2N7Z, 5AR3, 5AR2, 5AR7, 5AR8, 5AR5, 5AR4, 2N83, 5J7B, 5J79
Enzyme activity
EC #	BRENDA	ExPASy	KEGG	MetaCyc
2.7.10.2	↗	↗	↗	↗
2.7.11.1	↗	↗	↗	↗

Gene location (Human)
Chr.	Chromosome 8 (human)
Band	8q21.3	Start	89,757,806 bp
Band	8q21.3	End	89,791,064 bp

Gene location (Mouse)
Chr.	Chromosome 4 (mouse)
Band	4 A2|4 6.7 cM	Start	16,122,733 bp
Band	4 A2|4 6.7 cM	End	16,163,647 bp
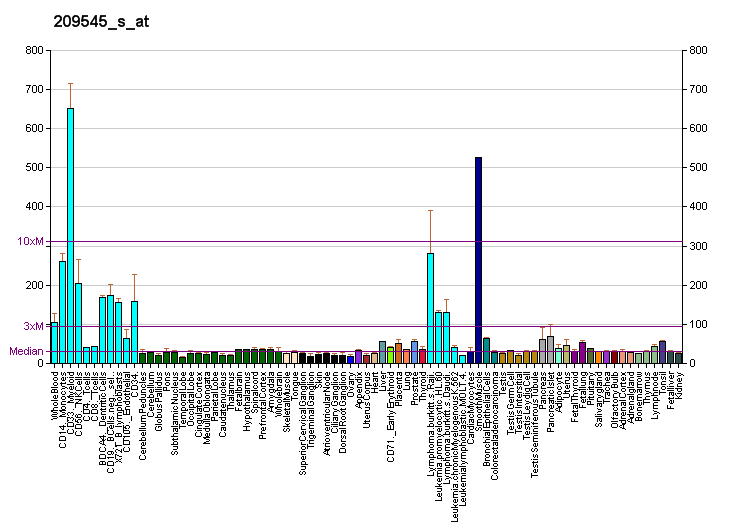

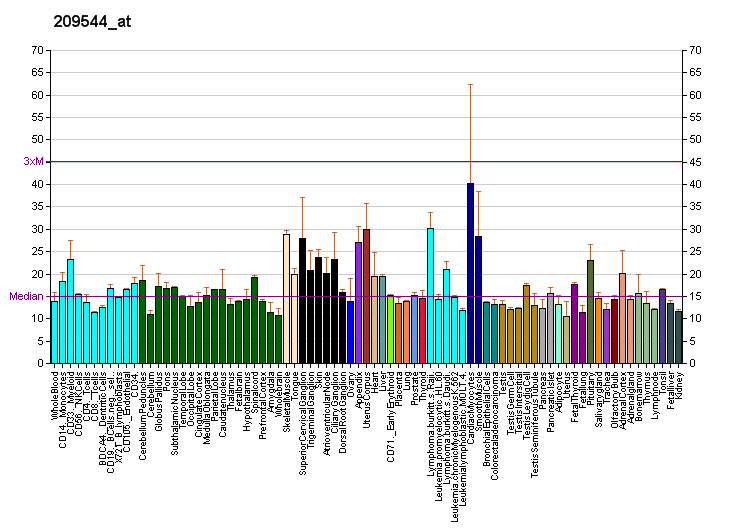
RNA expression pattern
Bgee	Human / Mouse (ortholog); Top expressed in: cartilage tissue; monocyte; gonad; vena cava; bone marrow; stromal cell of endometrium; granulocyte; gallbladder; skin of arm; oocyte / Top expressed in: zygote; esophagus; genital tubercle; secondary oocyte; tibiofemoral joint; tail of embryo; embryo; lens; granulocyte; primary oocyte; More reference expression data
BioGPS	More reference expression data
Gene ontology
Molecular function	LIM domain binding; kinase activity; CARD domain binding; signaling receptor binding; ATP binding; protein kinase activity; non-membrane spanning protein tyrosine kinase activity; transferase activity; protein homodimerization activity; protein binding; nucleotide binding; signal transducer activity; protein serine/threonine kinase activity; identical protein binding; caspase binding; JUN kinase kinase kinase activity
Cellular component	cytoplasm; cytoskeleton; vesicle; cytosol; protein-containing complex
Biological process	response to interleukin-1; positive regulation of cytokine-mediated signaling pathway; response to exogenous dsRNA; positive regulation of JNK cascade; positive regulation of xenophagy; cellular response to muramyl dipeptide; protein phosphorylation; positive regulation of ERK1 and ERK2 cascade; cellular response to peptidoglycan; positive regulation of stress-activated MAPK cascade; defense response to Gram-positive bacterium; apoptotic process; regulation of apoptotic process; positive regulation of immature T cell proliferation; positive regulation of interleukin-12 production; positive regulation of interferon-alpha production; positive regulation of peptidyl-serine phosphorylation; JNK cascade; response to interleukin-12; nucleotide-binding oligomerization domain containing 2 signaling pathway; positive regulation of T-helper 1 type immune response; positive regulation of alpha-beta T cell proliferation; positive regulation of interleukin-6 production; positive regulation of tumor necrosis factor production; positive regulation of peptidyl-tyrosine phosphorylation; inflammatory response; I-kappaB kinase/NF-kappaB signaling; nucleotide-binding oligomerization domain containing 1 signaling pathway; positive regulation of interferon-beta production; phosphorylation; immune system process; positive regulation of T-helper 1 cell differentiation; negative regulation of apoptotic process; cellular response to lipoteichoic acid; positive regulation of interleukin-2 production; positive regulation of chemokine production; nucleotide-binding oligomerization domain containing signaling pathway; positive regulation of protein ubiquitination; lipopolysaccharide-mediated signaling pathway; positive regulation of interferon-gamma production; T cell proliferation; positive regulation of peptidyl-threonine phosphorylation; positive regulation of apoptotic process; positive regulation of I-kappaB kinase/NF-kappaB signaling; peptidyl-tyrosine phosphorylation; cellular response to lipopolysaccharide; T cell receptor signaling pathway; response to interleukin-18; signal transduction; positive regulation of transcription by RNA polymerase II; toll-like receptor 4 signaling pathway; toll-like receptor 2 signaling pathway; innate immune response; MAPK cascade; adaptive immune response; positive regulation of protein binding; positive regulation of NF-kappaB transcription factor activity; activation of cysteine-type endopeptidase activity; positive regulation of cell death; interleukin-1-mediated signaling pathway
Sources:Amigo / QuickGO
Orthologs
Databases	NCBI: entry; OMA: entry
Species	Human	Mouse
Entrez	8767	192656
Ensembl	ENSG00000104312	ENSMUSG00000041135
UniProt	O43353	P58801
RefSeq (mRNA)	NM_003821; NM_001375360	NM_138952; NM_001329751
RefSeq (protein)	NP_003812; NP_001362289	NP_001316680; NP_620402
Location (UCSC)	Chr 8: 89.76 – 89.79 Mb	Chr 4: 16.12 – 16.16 Mb
PubMed search
- Wikidata
View/Edit Human	View/Edit Mouse

Receptor-interacting serine/threonine-protein kinase 2 is an enzyme that in humans is encoded by the RIPK2 gene.

This gene encodes a member of the receptor-interacting protein (RIP) family of serine/threonine protein kinases. The encoded protein contains a C-terminal caspase recruitment domain (CARD), and is a component of signaling complexes in both the innate and adaptive immune pathways. It is a potent activator of NF-κB and inducer of apoptosis in response to various stimuli.

== Interactions ==
RIPK2 has been shown to interact with BIRC2.
