= CASP8AP2 =

Protein-coding gene in the species Homo sapiens

Available structures
PDB	Ortholog search: PDBe RCSB
PDB	List of PDB id codes 2LR8

Identifiers
- Aliases: CASP8AP2, CED-4, FLASH, RIP25, caspase 8 associated protein 2
- External IDs: OMIM: 606880; MGI: 1349399; HomoloGene: 8066; GeneCards: CASP8AP2; OMA:CASP8AP2 - orthologs

Gene location (Human)
Chr.	Chromosome 6 (human)
Band	6q15	Start	89,829,894 bp
Band	6q15	End	89,874,436 bp

Gene location (Mouse)
Chr.	Chromosome 4 (mouse)
Band	4 A5|4 14.27 cM	Start	32,615,451 bp
Band	4 A5|4 14.27 cM	End	32,653,265 bp
RNA expression pattern
Bgee	Human / Mouse (ortholog); Top expressed in: Achilles tendon; corpus callosum; epithelium of colon; testicle; ventricular zone; ganglionic eminence; tonsil; gonad; endometrium; lymph node / Top expressed in: zygote; secondary oocyte; primary oocyte; genital tubercle; tail of embryo; cumulus cell; primitive streak; abdominal wall; Gonadal ridge; medial ganglionic eminence; More reference expression data
BioGPS	n/a
Gene ontology
Molecular function	peptidase activator activity involved in apoptotic process; DNA binding; death receptor binding; transcription corepressor activity; SUMO polymer binding; protein binding; cysteine-type endopeptidase activator activity involved in apoptotic process
Cellular component	cytoplasm; PML body; mitochondrion; nucleus; nucleoplasm
Biological process	regulation of transcription, DNA-templated; Fas signaling pathway; transcription, DNA-templated; cellular response to mechanical stimulus; apoptotic signaling pathway; cell cycle; activation of cysteine-type endopeptidase activity involved in apoptotic process; extrinsic apoptotic signaling pathway via death domain receptors; signal transduction; apoptotic process; negative regulation of nucleic acid-templated transcription
Sources:Amigo / QuickGO
Orthologs
Species	Human	Mouse
Entrez	9994	26885
Ensembl	ENSG00000118412; ENSG00000288475	ENSMUSG00000028282
UniProt	Q9UKL3	Q9WUF3
RefSeq (mRNA)	NM_012115; NM_001137667; NM_001137668	NM_001122978; NM_011997
RefSeq (protein)	NP_001131139; NP_001131140; NP_036247	NP_001116450; NP_036127
Location (UCSC)	Chr 6: 89.83 – 89.87 Mb	Chr 4: 32.62 – 32.65 Mb
PubMed search
- Wikidata
View/Edit Human	View/Edit Mouse

CASP8-associated protein 2 is a protein, that in humans is encoded by the CASP8AP2 gene.

== Function ==
This protein is highly similar to FLASH, a mouse apoptotic protein identified by its interaction with the death-effector domain (DED) of caspase 8. Researches of FLASH protein suggested that this protein may be a component of the death-inducing signaling complex, that includes Fas receptor, Fas-binding adapter FADD, and caspase 8, and plays a regulatory role in Fas-mediated apoptosis.

== Interactions ==
CASP8AP2 has been shown to interact with TRAF2.
