= XAF1 =

Protein-coding gene in the species Homo sapiens

Identifiers
- Aliases: XAF1, BIRC4BP, HSXIAPAF1, XIAPAF1, XIAP associated factor 1
- External IDs: OMIM: 606717; MGI: 3772572; GeneCards: XAF1
Available structures
PDB	Ortholog search: PDBe RCSB
PDB	List of PDB id codes 2LXW

Gene location (Human)
Chr.	Chromosome 17 (human)
Band	17p13.1	Start	6,755,447 bp
Band	17p13.1	End	6,775,647 bp

Gene location (Mouse)
Chr.	Chromosome 11 (mouse)
Band	11|11 B4	Start	72,192,455 bp
Band	11|11 B4	End	72,204,559 bp
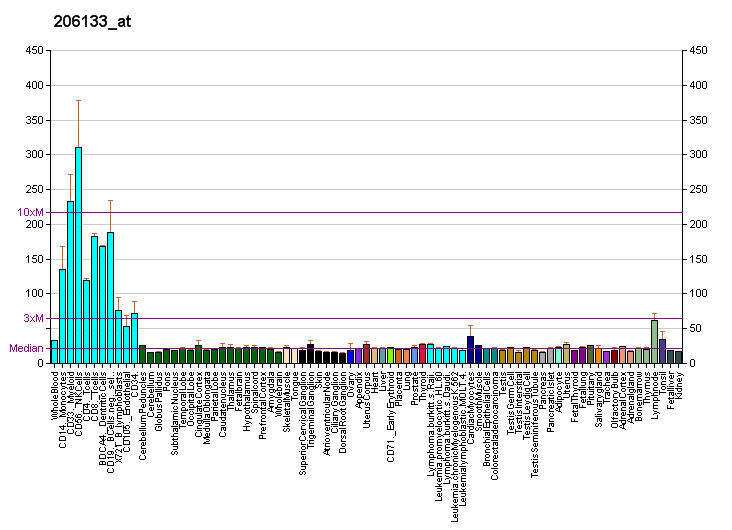
RNA expression pattern
Bgee	Human / Mouse (ortholog); Top expressed in: apex of heart; right ovary; left ovary; gallbladder; right uterine tube; monocyte; right lobe of liver; visceral pleura; spleen; endothelial cell / Top expressed in: decidua; cervix; right lung; epithelium of small intestine; right lung lobe; subcutaneous adipose tissue; carotid body; gastrula; sciatic nerve; duodenum; More reference expression data
BioGPS	More reference expression data
Gene ontology
Molecular function	metal ion binding; zinc ion binding
Cellular component	cytosol; cytoplasm; nucleus; mitochondrion
Biological process	apoptotic process; type I interferon signaling pathway; response to interferon-beta
Sources:Amigo / QuickGO
Orthologs
Databases	NCBI: entry; OMA: entry
Species	Human	Mouse
Entrez	54739	327959
Ensembl	ENSG00000132530	ENSMUSG00000040483
UniProt	Q6GPH4	Q5NBU8
RefSeq (mRNA)	NM_017523; NM_199139; NM_001353134; NM_001353135; NM_001353136 NM_001353137; NM_001353138; NM_001353139; NM_001353140	NM_001037713; NM_001291153
RefSeq (protein)	NP_059993; NP_954590; NP_001340063; NP_001340064; NP_001340065 NP_001340066; NP_001340067; NP_001340068; NP_001340069	NP_001032802; NP_001278082
Location (UCSC)	Chr 17: 6.76 – 6.78 Mb	Chr 11: 72.19 – 72.2 Mb
PubMed search
- Wikidata
View/Edit Human	View/Edit Mouse

XIAP-associated factor 1 is a protein that in humans is encoded by the XAF1 gene.

== Function ==
X-linked inhibitor of apoptosis (XIAP; MIM 300079) is a potent member of the IAP family. All members of this family possess baculoviral IAP (BIR) repeats, cysteine-rich domains of approximately 80 amino acids that bind and inhibit caspases (e.g., CASP3; MIM 600636). XIAP has 3 BIR domains and a C-terminal RING zinc finger that possesses E3 ubiquitin ligase (see MIM 601623) activity. XAF1 antagonizes the anticaspase activity of XIAP and may be important in mediating apoptosis resistance in cancer cells (Liston et al., 2001).[supplied by OMIM]

== Interactions ==
XAF1 has been shown to interact with XIAP.
