= MAP4K5 =

Protein-coding gene in the species Homo sapiens

Identifiers
- Aliases: MAP4K5, GCKR, KHS, KHS1, MAPKKKK5, mitogen-activated protein kinase kinase kinase kinase 5
- External IDs: OMIM: 604923; MGI: 1925503; GeneCards: MAP4K5
Enzyme activity
| EC # | BRENDA | ExPASy | KEGG | MetaCyc |
|---|---|---|---|---|
| 2.7.11.1 | ↗ | ↗ | ↗ | ↗ |

Gene location (Human)
| Chr. | Chromosome 14 (human) |
| Band | 14q22.1 | Start | 50,418,501 bp |
| Band | 14q22.1 | End | 50,561,126 bp |

Gene location (Mouse)
| Chr. | Chromosome 12 (mouse) |
| Band | 12|12 C2 | Start | 69,850,524 bp |
| Band | 12|12 C2 | End | 69,939,974 bp |
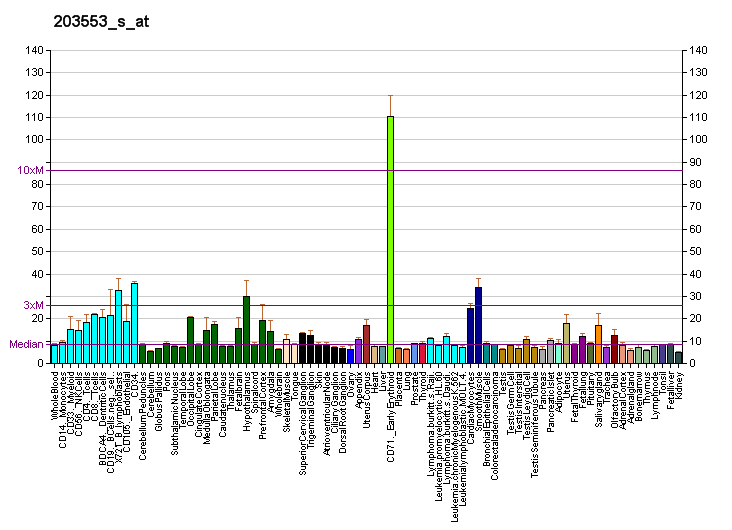

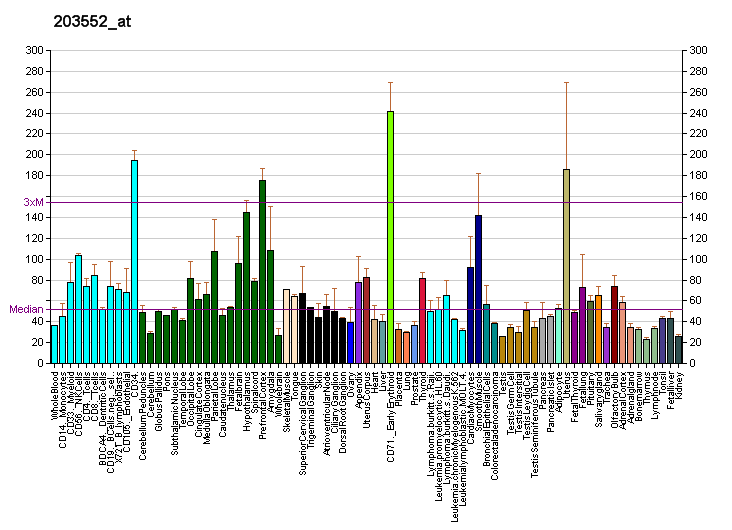
RNA expression pattern
| Bgee | Human / Mouse (ortholog); Top expressed in: corpus callosum; sural nerve; Achilles tendon; tibia; canal of the cervix; ectocervix; body of uterus; C1 segment; germinal epithelium; left ovary / Top expressed in: secondary oocyte; zygote; interventricular septum; primary oocyte; genital tubercle; atrium; dermis; mandibular prominence; maxillary prominence; atrioventricular valve; More reference expression data |
| BioGPS | More reference expression data |
Gene ontology
| Molecular function | transferase activity; protein kinase activity; protein serine/threonine kinase activity; nucleotide binding; protein binding; ATP binding; kinase activity; MAP kinase kinase kinase kinase activity |
| Cellular component | cytoplasm |
| Biological process | protein phosphorylation; intracellular signal transduction; phosphorylation; regulation of mitotic cell cycle; regulation of apoptotic process; signal transduction; stress-activated protein kinase signaling cascade; activation of protein kinase activity |
Sources:Amigo / QuickGO
Orthologs
| Databases | NCBI: entry; OMA: entry |
| Species | Human | Mouse |
| Entrez | 11183 | 399510 |
| Ensembl | ENSG00000012983 | ENSMUSG00000034761 |
| UniProt | Q9Y4K4 | Q8BPM2 |
| RefSeq (mRNA) | NM_006575; NM_198794 | NM_201519 |
| RefSeq (protein) | NP_006566; NP_942089 | NP_958927 |
| Location (UCSC) | Chr 14: 50.42 – 50.56 Mb | Chr 12: 69.85 – 69.94 Mb |
| PubMed search |
- Wikidata
| View/Edit Human | View/Edit Mouse |

Mitogen-activated protein kinase kinase kinase kinase 5 is an enzyme that in humans is encoded by the MAP4K5 gene.

This gene encodes a member of the serine/threonine protein kinase family, that is highly similar to yeast SPS1/STE20 kinase. Yeast SPS1/STE20 functions near the beginning of the MAP kinase signal cascades that is essential for yeast pheromone response. This kinase was shown to activate Jun kinase in mammalian cells, which suggested a role in stress response. Two alternatively spliced transcript variants encoding the same protein have been described for this gene.

== Interactions ==
MAP4K5 has been shown to interact with CRKL and TRAF2.
