= RAB8A =

Protein-coding gene in the species Homo sapiens

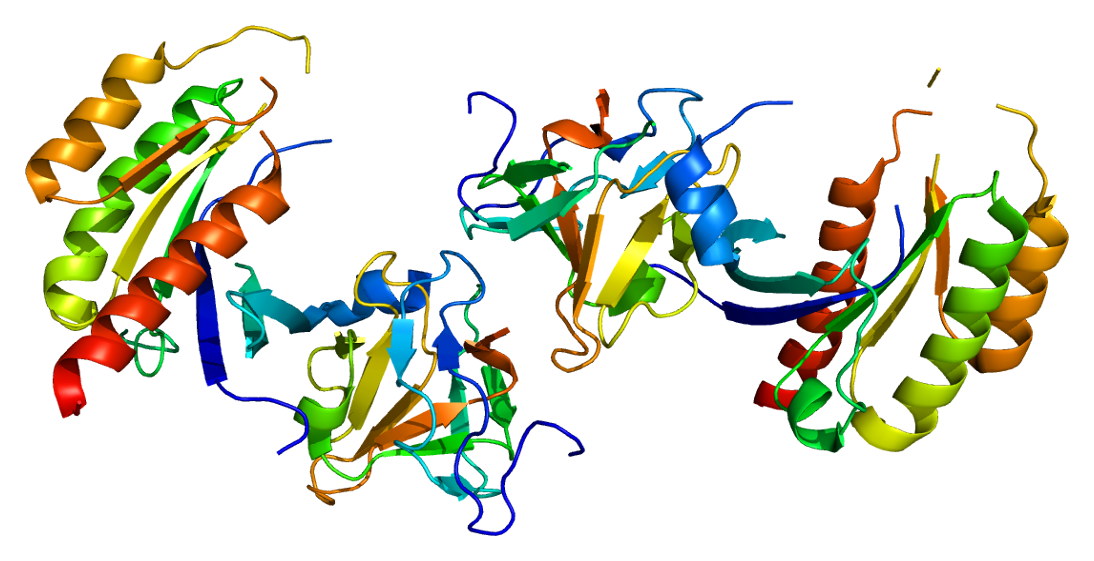

Identifiers
- Aliases: RAB8A, MEL, RAB8, member RAS oncogene family
- External IDs: OMIM: 165040; MGI: 96960; GeneCards: RAB8A
Available structures
PDB	Ortholog search: PDBe RCSB
PDB	List of PDB id codes 3QBT, 3TNF, 4LHV, 4LHW, 4LHX, 4LHY, 4LHZ, 4LI0
Enzyme activity
EC #	BRENDA	ExPASy	KEGG	MetaCyc
3.6.5.2	↗	↗	↗	↗

Gene location (Human)
Chr.	Chromosome 19 (human)
Band	19p13.11	Start	16,111,889 bp
Band	19p13.11	End	16,134,234 bp

Gene location (Mouse)
Chr.	Chromosome 8 (mouse)
Band	8 B3.3|8 34.84 cM	Start	72,915,044 bp
Band	8 B3.3|8 34.84 cM	End	72,937,748 bp
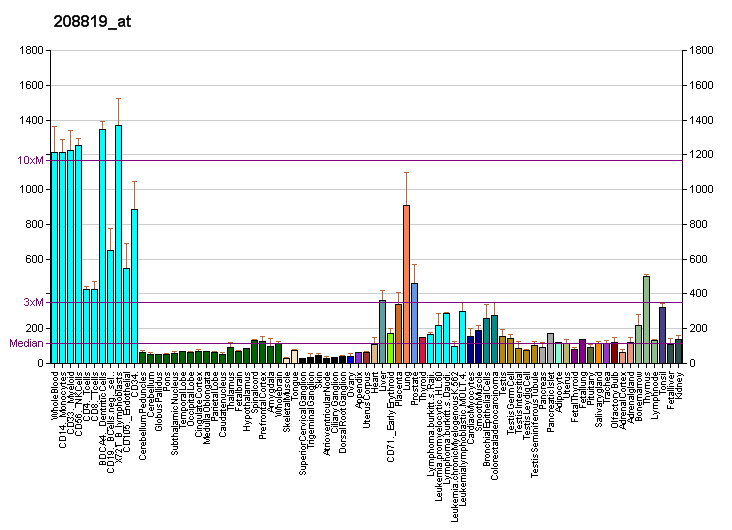
RNA expression pattern
Bgee	Human / Mouse (ortholog); Top expressed in: monocyte; mucosa of ileum; bone marrow cell; duodenum; mucosa of sigmoid colon; jejunal mucosa; blood; epithelium of colon; granulocyte; human penis / Top expressed in: granulocyte; molar; yolk sac; tibiofemoral joint; thymus; duodenum; right kidney; epithelium of small intestine; ventricular zone; medial ganglionic eminence; More reference expression data
BioGPS	More reference expression data
Gene ontology
Molecular function	nucleotide binding; GDP binding; GTP binding; myosin V binding; protein binding; protein kinase binding; GTPase activity
Cellular component	cytoplasm; ciliary basal body; recycling endosome; cytosol; endosome; centrosome; phagocytic vesicle membrane; Golgi apparatus; cell projection; membrane; postsynaptic density; synaptic vesicle; Golgi membrane; cilium; ciliary base; soma; dendrite; phagocytic vesicle; centriole; extracellular exosome; cytoskeleton; cytoplasmic vesicle; extracellular matrix; plasma membrane; trans-Golgi network transport vesicle; trans-Golgi network membrane; dendritic spine; recycling endosome membrane; non-motile cilium; secretory granule membrane; midbody; synapse; glutamatergic synapse
Biological process	regulation of long-term neuronal synaptic plasticity; regulation of protein transport; axonogenesis; vesicle docking involved in exocytosis; protein secretion; regulation of protein localization; cell projection organization; G2/M transition of mitotic cell cycle; Golgi vesicle fusion to target membrane; protein transport; protein localization to plasma membrane; cellular response to insulin stimulus; cilium assembly; ciliary basal body-plasma membrane docking; neurotransmitter receptor transport to postsynaptic membrane; regulation of autophagy; autophagy; post-translational protein modification; regulation of exocytosis; transport; intracellular protein transport; Rab protein signal transduction; neurotransmitter receptor transport, endosome to postsynaptic membrane; vesicle-mediated transport in synapse
Sources:Amigo / QuickGO
Orthologs
Databases	NCBI: entry; OMA: entry
Species	Human	Mouse
Entrez	4218	17274
Ensembl	ENSG00000167461	ENSMUSG00000003037
UniProt	P61006	P55258
RefSeq (mRNA)	NM_005370	NM_023126
RefSeq (protein)	NP_005361; NP_005361.2	NP_075615
Location (UCSC)	Chr 19: 16.11 – 16.13 Mb	Chr 8: 72.92 – 72.94 Mb
PubMed search
- Wikidata
View/Edit Human	View/Edit Mouse

Ras-related protein Rab-8A is a protein that in humans is encoded by the RAB8A gene.

== Function ==
The protein encoded by this gene is a member of the RAS superfamily which are small GTP/GDP-binding proteins with an average size of 200 amino acids. The RAS-related proteins of the RAB/YPT family may play a role in the transport of proteins from the endoplasmic reticulum to the Golgi and the plasma membrane. This protein shares 97%, 96%, and 51% similarity with the dog RAB8, mouse MEL, and mouse YPT1 proteins, respectively and contains the 4 GTP/GDP-binding sites that are present in all the RAS proteins. The putative effector-binding site of this protein is similar to that of the RAB/YPT proteins. However, this protein contains a C-terminal CAAX motif that is characteristic of many RAS superfamily members but which is not found in YPT1 and the majority of RAB proteins. Although this gene was isolated as a transforming gene from a melanoma cell line, no link between MEL and melanoma has been demonstrated. This oncogene is located 800 kb distal to MY09B on chromosome 19p13.1.

== Interactions ==
RAB8A has been shown to interact with Optineurin and MAP4K2.
