= STRAD beta =

Protein found in humans

STRADB

Identifiers
- Aliases: STRADB, STE20-related kinase adaptor beta, CALS-21, ILPIP, ILPIPA, PAPK, PRO1038, ALS2CR2, STE20 related adaptor beta
- External IDs: OMIM: 607333; MGI: 2144047; GeneCards: STRADB

Gene location (Human)
Chr.	Chromosome 2 (human)
Band	2q33.1	Start	201,387,858 bp
Band	2q33.1	End	201,480,846 bp

Gene location (Mouse)
Chr.	Chromosome 1 (mouse)
Band	1 C1.3|1 29.2 cM	Start	59,012,681 bp
Band	1 C1.3|1 29.2 cM	End	59,034,874 bp
RNA expression pattern
Bgee	Human / Mouse (ortholog); Top expressed in: right adrenal cortex; blood; left adrenal gland; gastrocnemius muscle; left adrenal cortex; muscle of thigh; right lobe of liver; skeletal muscle tissue; duodenum; rectum / Top expressed in: vastus lateralis muscle; triceps brachii muscle; knee joint; sternocleidomastoid muscle; medial head of gastrocnemius muscle; temporal muscle; blood; digastric muscle; tibialis anterior muscle; skeletal muscle tissue; More reference expression data
BioGPS	n/a
Gene ontology
Molecular function	protein kinase activity; nucleotide binding; protein binding; ATP binding; protein serine/threonine kinase activity
Cellular component	cytoplasm; nucleus; cytosol; aggresome
Biological process	protein phosphorylation; cell cycle; negative regulation of extrinsic apoptotic signaling pathway in absence of ligand; activation of protein kinase activity; cell morphogenesis; protein export from nucleus; regulation of mitotic cell cycle; stress-activated protein kinase signaling cascade; regulation of apoptotic process; MAPK cascade; signal transduction; neuron projection morphogenesis
Sources:Amigo / QuickGO
Orthologs
Databases	NCBI: entry; OMA: entry
Species	Human	Mouse
Entrez	55437	227154
Ensembl	ENSG00000082146	ENSMUSG00000026027
UniProt	Q9C0K7	Q8K4T3
RefSeq (mRNA)	NM_001206864; NM_018571	NM_172656; NM_173155
RefSeq (protein)	NP_001193793; NP_061041	NP_766244
Location (UCSC)	Chr 2: 201.39 – 201.48 Mb	Chr 1: 59.01 – 59.03 Mb
PubMed search
- Wikidata
View/Edit Human	View/Edit Mouse

STE20-related kinase adapter protein beta (or STRAD beta) is an enzyme that in humans is encoded by the STRADB gene (previously ALS2CR2).

This gene encodes a protein that belongs to the serine/threonine protein kinase STE20 subfamily. One of the active site residues in the protein kinase domain of this protein is altered, and it is thus a pseudokinase. This protein is a component of a complex involved in the activation of serine/threonine kinase 11, a master kinase that regulates cell polarity and energy-generating metabolism. This complex regulates the relocation of this kinase from the nucleus to the cytoplasm, and it is essential for G1 cell cycle arrest mediated by this kinase. The protein encoded by this gene can also interact with the X chromosome-linked inhibitor of apoptosis protein, and this interaction enhances the anti-apoptotic activity of this protein via the JNK1 signal transduction pathway. Two pseudogenes, located on chromosomes 1 and 7, have been found for this gene.

== Interactions ==
ALS2CR2 has been shown to interact with XIAP.
