= Diablo homolog =

Protein-coding gene in the species Homo sapiens

DIABLO
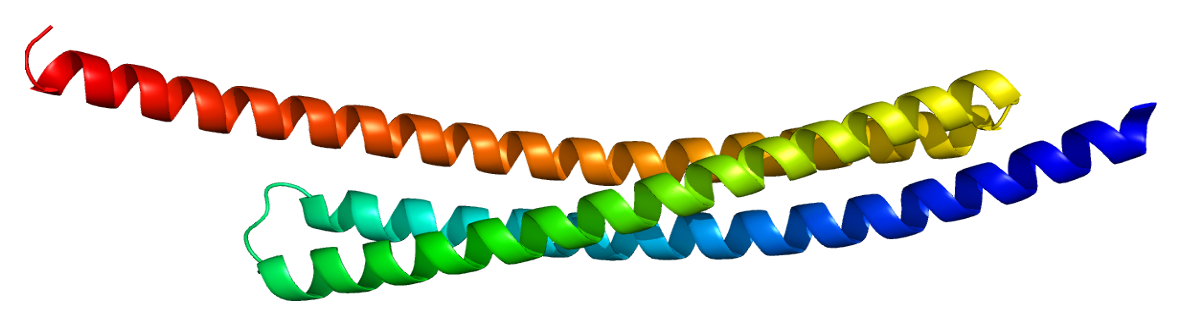

Identifiers
- Aliases: DIABLO, DFNA64, SMAC, Diablo, Diablo homolog, diablo IAP-binding mitochondrial protein
- External IDs: OMIM: 605219; MGI: 1913843; GeneCards: DIABLO
Available structures
PDB	Ortholog search: PDBe RCSB
PDB	List of PDB id codes 1FEW, 1G3F, 1G73, 1OXQ, 1TW6, 1XB0, 1XB1, 3D9U, 3UIH, 3UIJ, 4TX5

Gene location (Human)
Chr.	Chromosome 12 (human)
Band	12q24.31	Start	122,207,663 bp
Band	12q24.31	End	122,227,456 bp

Gene location (Mouse)
Chr.	Chromosome 5 (mouse)
Band	5|5 F	Start	123,647,828 bp
Band	5|5 F	End	123,662,239 bp
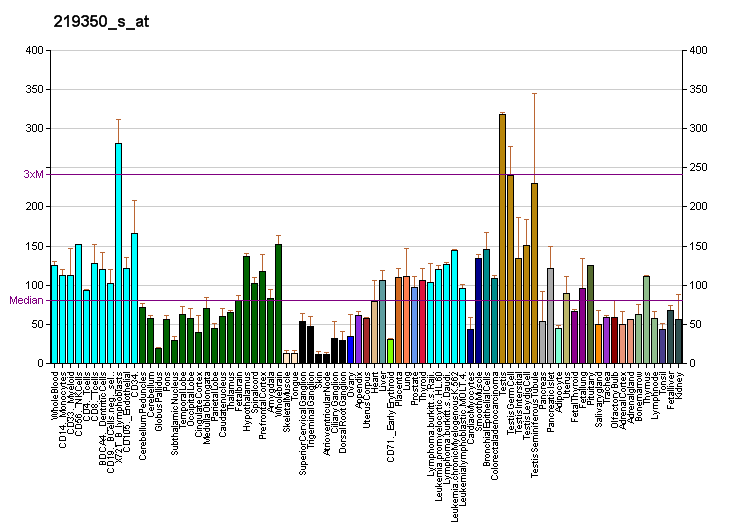
RNA expression pattern
Bgee	Human / Mouse (ortholog); Top expressed in: right testis; left testis; islet of Langerhans; anterior pituitary; ganglionic eminence; gonad; hypothalamus; C1 segment; substantia nigra; ventricular zone / Top expressed in: spermatocyte; spermatid; muscle of thigh; embryo; right kidney; ventricular zone; morula; embryo; lip; yolk sac; More reference expression data
BioGPS	More reference expression data
Gene ontology
Molecular function	protein binding
Cellular component	cytosol; mitochondrial intermembrane space; mitochondrion; cytoplasmic side of plasma membrane; CD40 receptor complex
Biological process	intrinsic apoptotic signaling pathway; activation of cysteine-type endopeptidase activity involved in apoptotic process; extrinsic apoptotic signaling pathway via death domain receptors; apoptotic process; activation of cysteine-type endopeptidase activity involved in apoptotic process by cytochrome c; positive regulation of apoptotic process; intrinsic apoptotic signaling pathway in response to oxidative stress; neuron apoptotic process
Sources:Amigo / QuickGO
Orthologs
Databases	NCBI: entry; OMA: entry
Species	Human	Mouse
Entrez	56616	66593
Ensembl	ENSG00000184047	ENSMUSG00000029433
UniProt	Q9NR28	Q9JIQ3
RefSeq (mRNA)	NM_138930; NM_001278302; NM_001278303; NM_001278304; NM_001278342 NM_019887; NM_138929; NM_001371333	NM_023232
RefSeq (protein)	NP_001265231; NP_001265232; NP_001265233; NP_001265271; NP_063940 NP_620308; NP_001358262; NP_001265231.1	NP_075721
Location (UCSC)	Chr 12: 122.21 – 122.23 Mb	Chr 5: 123.65 – 123.66 Mb
PubMed search
- Wikidata
View/Edit Human	View/Edit Mouse

Diablo homolog (DIABLO) is a mitochondrial protein that in humans is encoded by the DIABLO (direct IAP binding protein with low pI) gene on chromosome 12. DIABLO is also referred to as second mitochondria-derived activator of caspases or SMAC. This protein binds inhibitor of apoptosis proteins (IAPs), thus freeing caspases to activate apoptosis. Due to its proapoptotic function, SMAC is implicated in a broad spectrum of tumors, and small molecule SMAC mimetics have been developed to enhance current cancer treatments.

== Structure ==
=== Protein ===
This gene encodes a 130 Å-long, arch-shaped homodimer protein. The full-length protein product spans 239 residues, 55 of which comprise the mitochondrial-targeting sequence (MTS) at its N-terminal. However, once the full-length protein is imported into the mitochondria, this sequence is excised to produce the 184-residue mature protein. This cleavage also exposes four residues at the N-terminal, Ala-Val-Pro-Ile (AVPI), which is the core of the IAP binding domain and crucial for inhibiting XIAP. Specifically, the tetrapeptide sequence binds the BIR3 domain of XIAP to form a stable complex between SMAC and XIAP. The homodimer structure also facilitates SMAC-XIAP binding via the BIR2 domain, though it does not form until the protein is released into the cytoplasm as a result of outer mitochondrial membrane permeabilization. Thus, monomeric SMAC mutants can still bind the BIR3 domain but not the BIR2 domain, which compromises the protein’s inhibitory function. Meanwhile, mutations within the AVPI sequence lead to loss of function, though SMAC may still be able to perform IAP binding-independent functions, such as inducing the ubiquitinylation of XIAP.

=== Gene ===
Several alternatively spliced transcript variants that encode distinct isoforms have been described for this gene, but the validity of some transcripts, and their predicted ORFs, has not been determined conclusively. Two known isoforms both lack the MTS and the IAP binding domain, suggesting differential subcellular localization and function.

== Function ==
SMAC is a mitochondrial protein that promotes cytochrome c- and TNF receptor-dependent activation of apoptosis by inhibiting the effect of IAP – a group of proteins that negatively regulate apoptosis, or programmed cell death. SMAC is normally a mitochondrial protein localized to the mitochondrial intermembrane space, but it enters the cytosol when cells undergo apoptosis. Through the intrinsic pathway of apoptosis, BCL-2 proteins like BAK and BAX form a pore in the outer mitochondrial membrane, leading to mitochondrial membrane permeabilization and the release of both cytochrome c and SMAC. While cytochrome c directly activates APAF1 and caspase 9, SMAC binds IAPs, such as XIAP and cIAP proteins, to inhibit their caspase-binding activity and allow for caspase activation of apoptosis. SMAC is ubiquitously expressed in many cell types, implicating it in various biological processes involving apoptosis. Currently, nonapoptotic functions for SMAC remain unclear.

== Clinical significance ==
SMAC is involved in cancer, and its overexpression is linked to increased sensitivity in tumor cells to apoptosis. So far, SMAC overexpression has been observed to oppose cancer progression in head and neck squamous cell carcinoma, hepatocellular carcinoma, Hodgkin lymphoma, breast cancer, glioblastoma, thyroid cancer, renal cell carcinoma, testicular germ cell tumors, colorectal cancer, lung cancer, bladder cancer, endometrioid endometrial cancer, and other sarcomas. However, the exact relationship between SMAC and leukemia and hematological diseases remains controversial. SMAC mimetics monotherapy displays improved cytotoxic effects on leukemic cell lines compared to combined therapy with other drugs, which is commonly more effective in other types of cancers.

Following experimental elucidation of SMAC structure, small-molecule SMAC mimetics have been developed to mimic the tetrapeptide AVPI in the IAP binding domain of SMAC, which is responsible for binding the BIR3 domains in IAPs like XIAP, cIAP1, and cIAP2 to induce apoptosis, and sometimes, necroptosis. Several of the numerous SMAC mimetics designed within the last decade or so are now undergoing clinical trials, including SM-406 by Bai and colleagues and two mimetics by Genentech. These mimetics are also designed to target tumor cells directly through interacting with inflammatory proteins, such as IL-1β, which are commonly produced by solid tumor lesions. Notably, preclinical studies indicate that the use of SMAC mimetics in conjunction with chemotherapy, death receptor ligands and agonists, as well as small molecule targeted drugs enhance the sensitivity of tumor cells to these treatments. In addition to improving the success of tumor elimination, this increased sensitivity can permit smaller doses, thus minimizing side effects while maintaining efficacy. Nonetheless, there still exists the potential for side effects, such as elevated levels of cytokines and chemokines in normal tissues, depending on the cellular environment.

In addition to cancers, mutations in DIABLO is associated with young-adult onset of nonsyndromic deafness-64.

== Interactions ==
Diablo homolog has been shown to interact with:

- cIAP1,
- cIAP2,
- BIRC5,
- LTBR, and
- XIAP.
