= BIRC7 =

Protein-coding gene in the species Homo sapiens

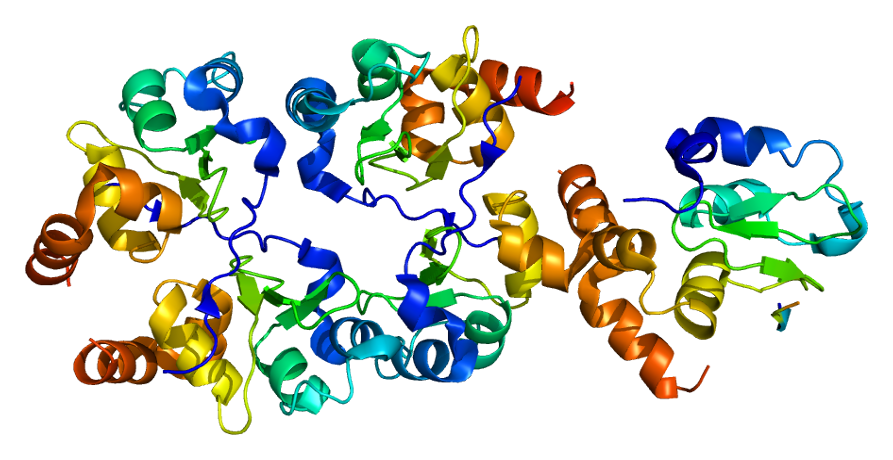

Identifiers
- Aliases: BIRC7, KIAP, LIVIN, ML-IAP, MLIAP, RNF50, baculoviral IAP repeat containing 7
- External IDs: OMIM: 605737; MGI: 2676458; GeneCards: BIRC7
Available structures
| PDB | Ortholog search: PDBe RCSB |
| PDB | List of PDB id codes 1OXN, 1OXQ, 1OY7, 1TW6, 2I3H, 2I3I, 3F7G, 3F7H, 3F7I, 3GT9, 3GTA, 3UW5, 4AUQ |
Enzyme activity
| EC # | BRENDA | ExPASy | KEGG | MetaCyc |
|---|---|---|---|---|
| 2.3.2.27 | ↗ | ↗ | ↗ | ↗ |

Gene location (Human)
| Chr. | Chromosome 20 (human) |
| Band | 20q13.33 | Start | 63,235,883 bp |
| Band | 20q13.33 | End | 63,240,495 bp |

Gene location (Mouse)
| Chr. | Chromosome 2 (mouse) |
| Band | 2|2 H4 | Start | 180,570,816 bp |
| Band | 2|2 H4 | End | 180,575,803 bp |
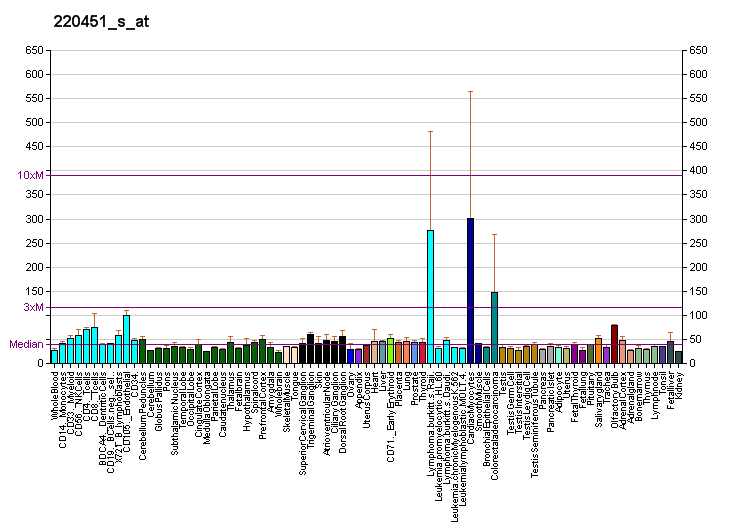
RNA expression pattern
| Bgee | Human / Mouse (ortholog); Top expressed in: tibial nerve; sural nerve; placenta; right adrenal cortex; right lung; gonad; skin of leg; skin of abdomen; lymph node; C1 segment / Top expressed in: lens; epithelium of lens; set of lens fibers; ankle; embryo; dentate gyrus; dentate gyrus of hippocampal formation granule cell; cerebellar cortex; primary visual cortex; neural tube; More reference expression data |
| BioGPS | More reference expression data |
Gene ontology
| Molecular function | peptidase inhibitor activity; cysteine-type endopeptidase inhibitor activity; metal ion binding; ubiquitin-protein transferase activity; protein binding; enzyme binding; transferase activity; cysteine-type endopeptidase inhibitor activity involved in apoptotic process; ubiquitin protein ligase activity |
| Cellular component | cytoplasm; Golgi apparatus; nucleus; microtubule organizing center; cytosol |
| Biological process | negative regulation of peptidase activity; inhibition of cysteine-type endopeptidase activity involved in apoptotic process; negative regulation of apoptotic process; regulation of natural killer cell apoptotic process; mitotic spindle assembly; regulation of cell population proliferation; regulation of signal transduction; protein ubiquitination; apoptotic process; positive regulation of protein ubiquitination; negative regulation of cysteine-type endopeptidase activity involved in apoptotic process |
Sources:Amigo / QuickGO
Orthologs
| Databases | NCBI: entry; OMA: entry |
| Species | Human | Mouse |
| Entrez | 79444 | 329581 |
| Ensembl | ENSG00000101197 | ENSMUSG00000038840 |
| UniProt | Q96CA5 | A2AWP0 |
| RefSeq (mRNA) | NM_139317; NM_022161 | NM_001163247 |
| RefSeq (protein) | NP_071444; NP_647478 | NP_001156719 |
| Location (UCSC) | Chr 20: 63.24 – 63.24 Mb | Chr 2: 180.57 – 180.58 Mb |
| PubMed search |
- Wikidata
| View/Edit Human | View/Edit Mouse |

Baculoviral IAP repeat-containing protein 7 is a protein that in humans is encoded by the BIRC7 gene.

The protein encoded by this gene is a member of the family of inhibitor of apoptosis proteins (IAP) and contains a single copy of a baculovirus IAP repeat (BIR) as well as a RING-type zinc finger domain. The BIR domain is essential for inhibitory activity and interacts with caspases, while the RING finger domain sometimes enhances antiapoptotic activity but does not inhibit apoptosis alone. Two transcript variants encoding different isoforms have been found for this gene. The two isoforms have different antiapoptotic properties, with isoform alpha protecting cells from apoptosis induced by staurosporine and isoform b protecting cells from apoptosis induced by etoposide. In melanoma, BIRC7 gene expression is regulated by the Microphthalmia-associated transcription factor.
