= MAP4K2 =

Protein-coding gene in humans

Identifiers
- Aliases: MAP4K2, BL44, GCK, RAB8IP, mitogen-activated protein kinase kinase kinase kinase 2
- External IDs: OMIM: 603166; MGI: 1346883; GeneCards: MAP4K2
Enzyme activity
EC #	BRENDA	ExPASy	KEGG	MetaCyc
2.7.11.1	↗	↗	↗	↗

Gene location (Human)
Chr.	Chromosome 11 (human)
Band	11q13.1	Start	64,784,918 bp
Band	11q13.1	End	64,803,241 bp

Gene location (Mouse)
Chr.	Chromosome 19 (mouse)
Band	19|19 A	Start	6,391,165 bp
Band	19|19 A	End	6,405,645 bp
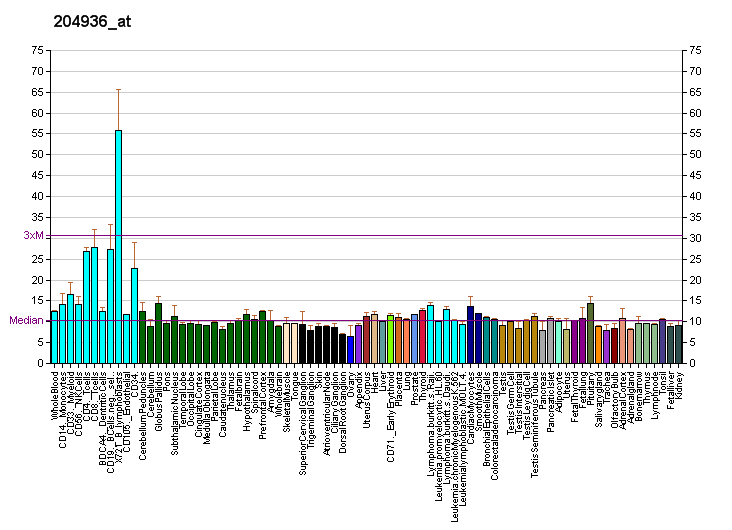
RNA expression pattern
Bgee	Human / Mouse (ortholog); Top expressed in: granulocyte; spleen; right lung; monocyte; right hemisphere of cerebellum; lymph node; gonad; right frontal lobe; upper lobe of left lung; prefrontal cortex / Top expressed in: granulocyte; thymus; cerebellum; spleen; cerebellar cortex; neural layer of retina; hypothalamus; striatum of neuraxis; primary visual cortex; superior frontal gyrus; More reference expression data
BioGPS	More reference expression data
Gene ontology
Molecular function	transferase activity; nucleotide binding; protein kinase activity; mitogen-activated protein kinase kinase kinase binding; kinase activity; protein serine/threonine kinase activity; protein binding; ATP binding; MAP kinase kinase kinase kinase activity
Cellular component	Golgi apparatus; membrane; Golgi membrane; plasma membrane; basolateral plasma membrane; cytoplasm
Biological process	intracellular signal transduction; vesicle targeting; phosphorylation; immune system process; positive regulation of JNK cascade; protein phosphorylation; JNK cascade; immune response; innate immune response; regulation of mitotic cell cycle; regulation of apoptotic process; signal transduction; stress-activated protein kinase signaling cascade; activation of protein kinase activity
Sources:Amigo / QuickGO
Orthologs
Databases	NCBI: entry; OMA: entry
Species	Human	Mouse
Entrez	5871	26412
Ensembl	ENSG00000168067	ENSMUSG00000024948
UniProt	Q12851	Q61161
RefSeq (mRNA)	NM_001307990; NM_004579	NM_001291787; NM_009006
RefSeq (protein)	NP_001294919; NP_004570	NP_001278716; NP_033032
Location (UCSC)	Chr 11: 64.78 – 64.8 Mb	Chr 19: 6.39 – 6.41 Mb
PubMed search
- Wikidata
View/Edit Human	View/Edit Mouse

Mitogen-activated protein kinase kinase kinase kinase 2 is an enzyme that in humans is encoded by the MAP4K2 gene.

== Function ==
The protein encoded by this gene is a member of the serine/threonine protein kinase family. Although this kinase is found in many tissues, its expression in lymphoid follicles is restricted to the cells of germinal centre, where it may participate in B-cell differentiation. This kinase can be activated by TNF-alpha, and has been shown to specifically activate MAP kinases. This kinase is also found to interact with TNF receptor-associated factor 2 (TRAF2), which is involved in the activation of MAP3K1/MEKK1. A recent study showed that MAP4K2 is a direct kinase of LATS1/2 and thus regulates the Hippo pathway effectors YAP and TAZ.

== Interactions ==
MAP4K2 has been shown to interact with RAB8A and TRAF2.
