= BIRC6 =

Protein-coding gene in humans

Identifiers
- Aliases: BIRC6, APOLLON, BRUCE, baculoviral IAP repeat containing 6
- External IDs: OMIM: 605638; MGI: 1276108; GeneCards: BIRC6
Available structures
PDB	Ortholog search: PDBe RCSB
PDB	List of PDB id codes 3CEG
Enzyme activity
EC #	BRENDA	ExPASy	KEGG	MetaCyc
2.3.2.24	↗	↗	↗	↗

Gene location (Human)
Chr.	Chromosome 2 (human)
Band	2p22.3	Start	32,357,023 bp
Band	2p22.3	End	32,618,878 bp

Gene location (Mouse)
Chr.	Chromosome 17 (mouse)
Band	17|17 E2	Start	74,835,290 bp
Band	17|17 E2	End	75,010,351 bp
RNA expression pattern
Bgee	Human / Mouse (ortholog); Top expressed in: pancreatic epithelial cell; Achilles tendon; pancreatic ductal cell; mucosa of ileum; tibialis anterior muscle; bone marrow cell; epithelium of colon; corpus callosum; skin of arm; mucosa of sigmoid colon / Top expressed in: tail of embryo; internal carotid artery; external carotid artery; genital tubercle; thymus; seminal vesicula; ventricular zone; cumulus cell; submandibular gland; ascending aorta; More reference expression data
BioGPS	n/a
Gene ontology
Molecular function	peptidase inhibitor activity; cysteine-type endopeptidase inhibitor activity; ubiquitin-protein transferase activity; protein binding; ubiquitin conjugating enzyme activity; transferase activity
Cellular component	cytoplasm; endosome; spindle pole; membrane; microtubule organizing center; trans-Golgi network; cytoskeleton; Golgi apparatus; intracellular membrane-bounded organelle; midbody; Flemming body; nucleus
Biological process	negative regulation of peptidase activity; spongiotrophoblast layer development; regulation of cytokinesis; placenta development; labyrinthine layer development; negative regulation of extrinsic apoptotic signaling pathway; negative regulation of apoptotic process; cell division; protein phosphorylation; regulation of cell population proliferation; protein ubiquitination; positive regulation of cell population proliferation; cell cycle; apoptotic process; negative regulation of endopeptidase activity; ubiquitin-dependent protein catabolic process
Sources:Amigo / QuickGO
Orthologs
Databases	NCBI: entry; OMA: entry
Species	Human	Mouse
Entrez	57448	12211
Ensembl	ENSG00000115760	ENSMUSG00000024073
UniProt	Q9NR09	O88738
RefSeq (mRNA)	NM_016252; NM_001378125	NM_007566
RefSeq (protein)	NP_057336; NP_001365054	NP_031592; NP_001389698
Location (UCSC)	Chr 2: 32.36 – 32.62 Mb	Chr 17: 74.84 – 75.01 Mb
PubMed search
- Wikidata
View/Edit Human	View/Edit Mouse

Baculoviral IAP repeat-containing protein 6 is a protein that in humans is encoded by the BIRC6 gene.

== Function ==
This gene encodes a protein with a BIR (baculoviral inhibition of apoptosis protein repeat) domain and a UBCc (ubiquitin-conjugating enzyme E2, catalytic) domain. This protein inhibits apoptosis by facilitating the degradation of apoptotic proteins by ubiquitination.

== Interactions ==
BIRC6 has been shown to interact with KIF23.

== Diseases ==
BIRC6 is implicated in leukemia, melanoma, breast cancer, lung cancer, colorectal cancer, and other cancers (see the Atlas of Genetics and Cytogenetics in Oncology and Haematology).
