= Baculoviral IAP repeat-containing protein 2 =

Protein-coding gene in the species Homo sapiens

BIRC2
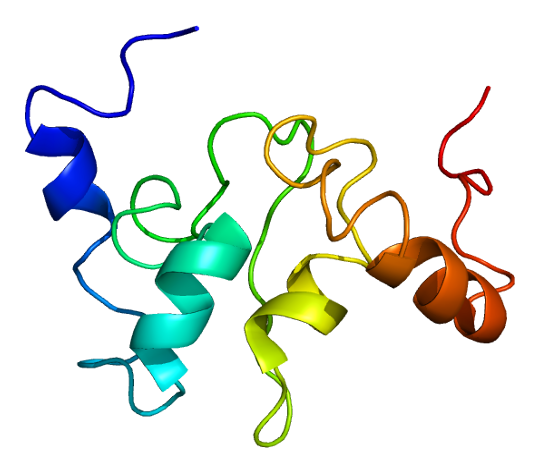

Identifiers
- Aliases: BIRC2, API1, HIAP2, Hiap-2, MIHB, RNF48, c-IAP1, cIAP1, baculoviral IAP repeat containing 2
- External IDs: OMIM: 601712; MGI: 1197009; GeneCards: BIRC2
Available structures
PDB	Ortholog search: PDBe RCSB
PDB	List of PDB id codes 1QBH, 2L9M, 3D9T, 3D9U, 3M1D, 3MUP, 3OZ1, 3T6P, 3UW4, 4EB9, 4HY4, 4HY5, 4KMN, 4LGE, 4LGU, 4MTI, 4MU7
Enzyme activity
EC #	BRENDA	ExPASy	KEGG	MetaCyc
2.3.2.27	↗	↗	↗	↗

Gene location (Human)
Chr.	Chromosome 11 (human)
Band	11q22.2	Start	102,347,211 bp
Band	11q22.2	End	102,378,670 bp

Gene location (Mouse)
Chr.	Chromosome 9 (mouse)
Band	9|9 A1	Start	7,818,228 bp
Band	9|9 A1	End	7,837,065 bp
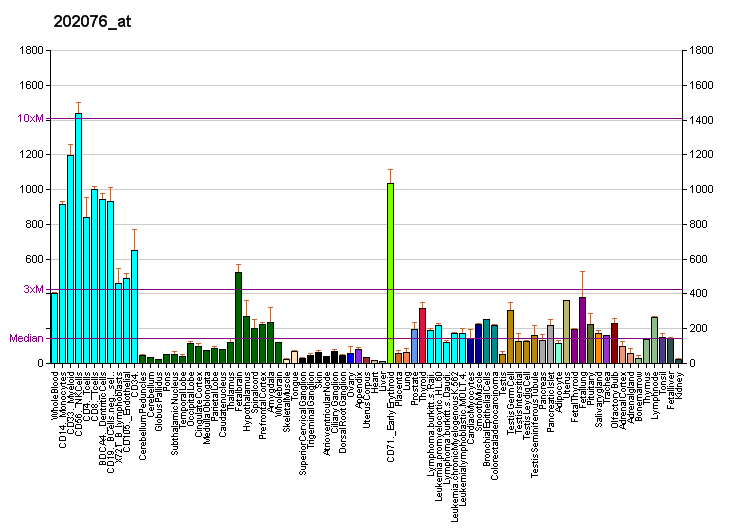
RNA expression pattern
Bgee	Human / Mouse (ortholog); Top expressed in: cartilage tissue; secondary oocyte; endothelial cell; epithelium of nasopharynx; germinal epithelium; tibia; visceral pleura; parietal pleura; pancreatic ductal cell; ventricular zone / Top expressed in: spermatocyte; blood; spermatid; mesenteric lymph nodes; spleen; seminiferous tubule; conjunctival fornix; pituitary gland; Gonadal ridge; thymus; More reference expression data
BioGPS	More reference expression data
Gene ontology
Molecular function	protein N-terminus binding; metal ion binding; cysteine-type endopeptidase inhibitor activity involved in apoptotic process; protein binding; transferase activity; ubiquitin binding; chaperone binding; FBXO family protein binding; zinc ion binding; transcription coactivator activity; ubiquitin-protein transferase activity; identical protein binding; ubiquitin protein ligase activity
Cellular component	cytosol; XY body; membrane raft; CD40 receptor complex; cytoplasmic side of plasma membrane; nucleus; cytoplasm; protein-containing complex
Biological process	regulation of apoptotic process; regulation of nucleotide-binding oligomerization domain containing signaling pathway; positive regulation of protein K63-linked ubiquitination; response to hypoxia; regulation of transcription, DNA-templated; regulation of innate immune response; response to organic cyclic compound; negative regulation of ripoptosome assembly involved in necroptotic process; inhibition of cysteine-type endopeptidase activity involved in apoptotic process; placenta development; regulation of cysteine-type endopeptidase activity; regulation of RIG-I signaling pathway; regulation of tumor necrosis factor-mediated signaling pathway; tumor necrosis factor-mediated signaling pathway; regulation of reactive oxygen species metabolic process; transcription, DNA-templated; positive regulation of protein monoubiquitination; mitotic spindle assembly; cell surface receptor signaling pathway; NIK/NF-kappaB signaling; regulation of cell population proliferation; response to organonitrogen compound; positive regulation of protein K48-linked ubiquitination; response to cAMP; response to ethanol; I-kappaB kinase/NF-kappaB signaling; proteasome-mediated ubiquitin-dependent protein catabolic process; necroptosis; apoptotic process; protein deubiquitination; cellular response to tumor necrosis factor; regulation of NIK/NF-kappaB signaling; positive regulation of protein polyubiquitination; negative regulation of necroptotic process; protein polyubiquitination; regulation of toll-like receptor signaling pathway; negative regulation of apoptotic process; positive regulation of I-kappaB kinase/NF-kappaB signaling; regulation of cell differentiation; regulation of inflammatory response; regulation of cell cycle; regulation of necroptotic process; protein heterooligomerization; positive regulation of nucleic acid-templated transcription; MyD88-independent toll-like receptor signaling pathway; TRIF-dependent toll-like receptor signaling pathway; positive regulation of protein ubiquitination; negative regulation of cysteine-type endopeptidase activity involved in apoptotic process
Sources:Amigo / QuickGO
Orthologs
Databases	NCBI: entry; OMA: entry
Species	Human	Mouse
Entrez	329	11797
Ensembl	ENSG00000110330	ENSMUSG00000057367
UniProt	Q13490	Q62210
RefSeq (mRNA)	NM_001256166; NM_001166; NM_001256163	NM_007465; NM_001291503
RefSeq (protein)	NP_001157; NP_001243092; NP_001243095	NP_001278432; NP_031491
Location (UCSC)	Chr 11: 102.35 – 102.38 Mb	Chr 9: 7.82 – 7.84 Mb
PubMed search
- Wikidata
View/Edit Human	View/Edit Mouse

Baculoviral IAP repeat-containing protein 2 (also known as cIAP1) is a protein that in humans is encoded by the BIRC2 gene. It belongs to the IAP family of proteins and therefore contains at least one BIR (baculoviral IAP repeat) domain. cIAP1 is a multi-functional protein which can be found in the cytoplasm of cells and in the nucleus of tumor cells. Its function in this particular case is yet to be understood. However, it is well known that this protein has a big influence in the growth of diverse cancers. cIAP1 is involved in the development process of osteosarcoma and gastric cancer among others.

== Location ==
The cellular localization of cIAP1 is diverse depending on the phase of the living cycle of the cell. In healthy cells the protein is usually found in the nucleus. This was experimentally determined by immunofluorescence microscopy and subcellular fractionations methods. However, when the cell is apoptotic nuclear export of cIAP1 is induced provoking an increase in the cytosolic concentration of the protein. When a cell is tumorous it does not cease to proliferate inhibiting the apoptosis, as a result, in cancerous cells cIAP1 is rarely located in the cytoplasm.

In case of dividing cells, cIAP1 is released into the cytosol early in mitosis, then reaccumulated in nucleus in late anaphase and in telophase. Nevertheless, there is a pool of cIAP1 associated to the midbody that acts as the exception to the regular rule.

== Structure ==
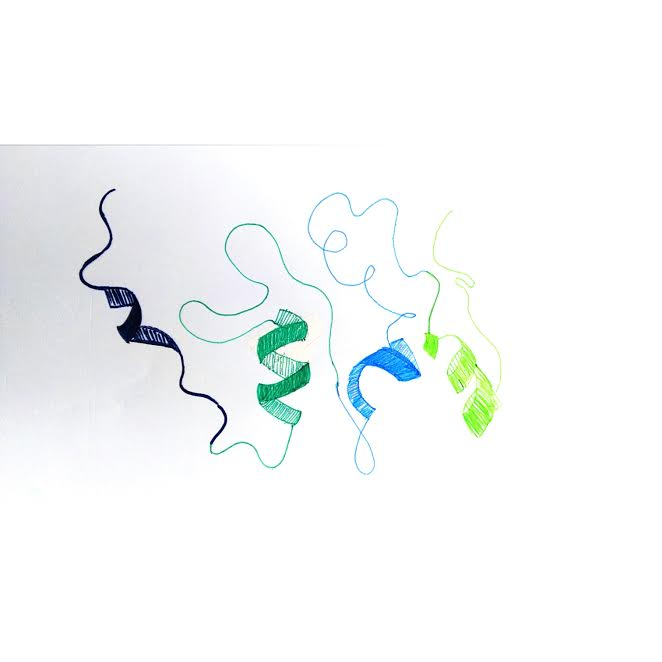
cIAP1 structure

The gene of cIAP1 resides on chromosome 11 and its protein has a quaternary structure. It has a unique protein chain, consequently, is an asymmetric monomer protein. Its tertiary structure is basically composed by alpha domain, formed almost exclusively from alpha helix. Its size is of 31,489 bases composed by 618 amino acids and has a molecular mass of 69900 Da. cIAP1 contains baculovirus IAP repeat domains that facilitate binding to caspases and other proteins. cIAP1 is recruited to TNF receptor complexes where they support cell survival through NF-κB activation while suppressing apoptosis by preventing caspase activation.

== Function ==
cIAP1 is an inhibitor of apoptosis protein. It directly ubiquitinates RIP1 and induces constitutive RIP1 ubiquitination in cancer cells. Ubiquinated RIP1 associates with the prosurvival kinase TAK1. When this complex is deubiquinated apoptosis is induced.

The absence of cIAP1 means that RIP1 will remain nonubiquitinated. As a consequence RIP1 forms a cytosolic complex with the adaptor molecule FADD and caspase 8, which leads to cell death. When cIAP1 ubiquitinates RIP1 this molecule acts as a signal activating the canonical NF-κB signaling pathway. The activation of this pathway stops the noncanonical one and simultaneously the apoptosis.

cIAP1 is important for the activation of MAPK signaling. MAPKs are involved in directing cellular responses to a diverse array os stimuli, such as mitogens, osmotic stress, heat shock and proinflammatory cytokines regulating cell functions including proliferation, gene expression, differentiation, mitosis, cell survival or apoptosis.

cIAP1 is as well implicated in innate immunity. When NOD-like receptors are activated by bacterial peptidoglycans, they oligomerize and recruit cIAP1, cIAP2, TRAF2 and RIP2. This allows cIAP1 mediated ubiquitination of RIP2, which leads to an expression of proinflammatory genes.

Other activities of the cIAP1 have been reported by Yanfei Qi et al. It has got a critical role in controlling β-cell survival under endoplasmatic reticulum (ER) stress. Studies show that when the protein is exposed to palmitate the concentration of cIAP1 decreases and, as a result, the apoptosis is no longer inhibited resulting in the death of the cell. ER stress increases cIAP1 expression in cancer cells through the UPR pathway, that is why, the induction of cIAP1 is suggested to be important for cancerous cell survival under stress conditions.

== Related diseases ==
Crohn's disease
cIAP1 is responsible for NOD signalling. When this signalling is defective, Crohn's disease is triggered. The most general symptoms of the disease are diarrhea, rectal bleeding and abdominal cramps and pain among others.

Pancreatic, liver, lung and oseophageal cancer
cIAP1 overexpression is directly related to the proliferation of the previously mentioned types of cancer. Several courses of treatment are focused on the removal of the IAPs to induce cells cytotoxicity.

Hemorrhage and Vascular Regression
cIAP1 has an important role on the maintenance of endothelial cells and blood vessel homeostasis during the development of the vessels. Mutations on the gene that encodes cIAP1 are related to hemorrhage and vascular regression because of the defects it represents on the endothelial cell survival and the modification of apoptosis.

== Interactions ==
BIRC2 has been shown to interact with:

- CASP9,
- DIABLO,
- GSPT1,
- HSP90B1,
- HTRA2,
- RIPK1,
- RIPK2
- TNFSF14,
- TRAF1,
- TRAF2, and
- UBC.
