= Baculoviral IAP repeat-containing protein 3 =

Protein-coding gene in the species Homo sapiens

BIRC3
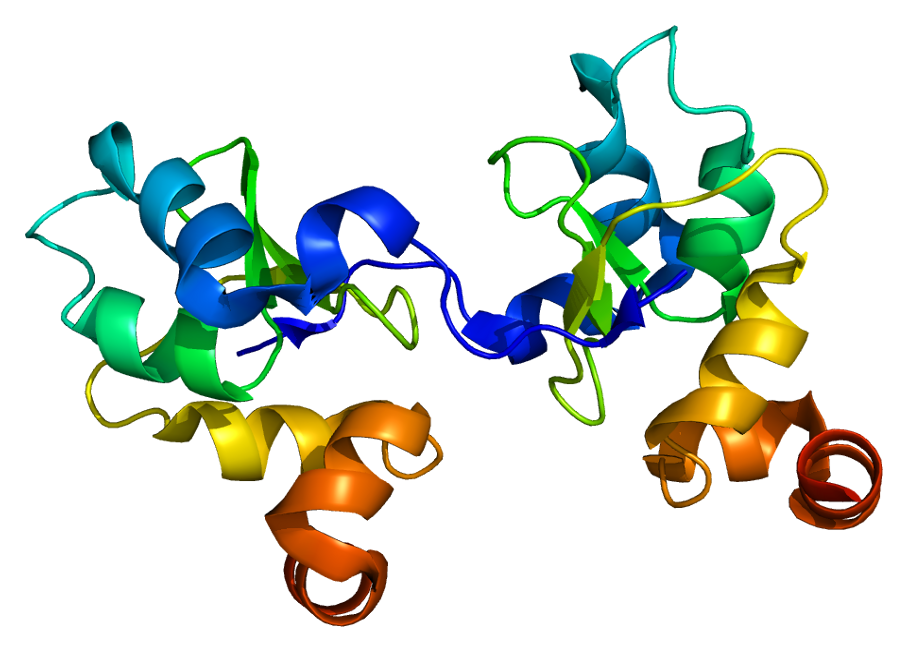

Identifiers
- Aliases: BIRC3, AIP1, API2, CIAP2, HAIP1, HIAP1, MALT2, MIHC, RNF49, c-IAP2, baculoviral IAP repeat containing 3, IAP-1
- External IDs: OMIM: 601721; MGI: 1197007; GeneCards: BIRC3
Available structures
PDB	Ortholog search: PDBe RCSB
PDB	List of PDB id codes 2UVL, 3EB5, 3EB6, 3M0A, 3M0D
Enzyme activity
EC #	BRENDA	ExPASy	KEGG	MetaCyc
2.3.2.27	↗	↗	↗	↗

Gene location (Human)
Chr.	Chromosome 11 (human)
Band	11q22.2	Start	102,317,450 bp
Band	11q22.2	End	102,339,403 bp

Gene location (Mouse)
Chr.	Chromosome 9 (mouse)
Band	9|9 A1	Start	7,848,700 bp
Band	9|9 A1	End	7,873,187 bp
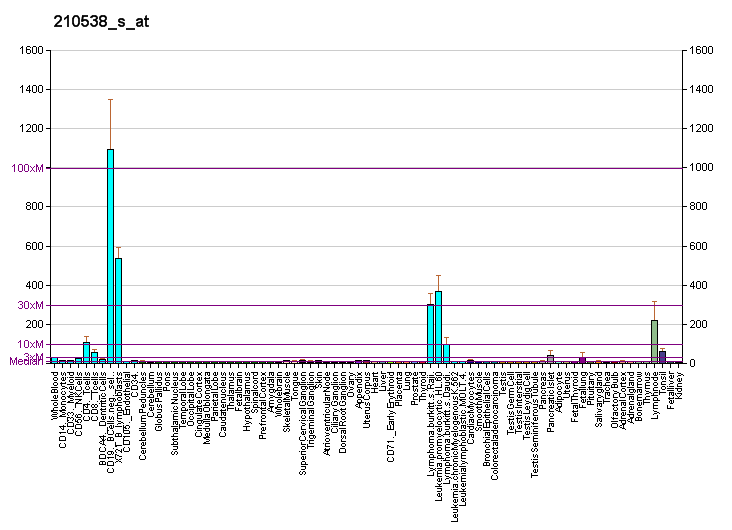
RNA expression pattern
Bgee	Human / Mouse (ortholog); Top expressed in: appendix; epithelium of nasopharynx; cartilage tissue; lymph node; spleen; gallbladder; granulocyte; mucosa of sigmoid colon; palpebral conjunctiva; tonsil / Top expressed in: secondary oocyte; zygote; primary oocyte; mesenteric lymph nodes; granulocyte; spleen; prostate; egg cell; lobe of prostate; thymus; More reference expression data
BioGPS	More reference expression data
Gene ontology
Molecular function	metal ion binding; cysteine-type endopeptidase inhibitor activity involved in apoptotic process; protein binding; ubiquitin-protein transferase activity; transferase activity; ubiquitin protein ligase activity
Cellular component	cytoplasm; nucleoplasm; membrane raft; nucleus; cytosol; protein-containing complex
Biological process	regulation of apoptotic process; regulation of nucleotide-binding oligomerization domain containing signaling pathway; regulation of innate immune response; regulation of toll-like receptor signaling pathway; negative regulation of necroptotic process; inhibition of cysteine-type endopeptidase activity involved in apoptotic process; regulation of cysteine-type endopeptidase activity; regulation of RIG-I signaling pathway; regulation of tumor necrosis factor-mediated signaling pathway; negative regulation of apoptotic process; tumor necrosis factor-mediated signaling pathway; mitotic spindle assembly; cell surface receptor signaling pathway; NIK/NF-kappaB signaling; spermatogenesis; regulation of inflammatory response; positive regulation of I-kappaB kinase/NF-kappaB signaling; I-kappaB kinase/NF-kappaB signaling; positive regulation of protein ubiquitination; apoptotic process; protein ubiquitination; protein deubiquitination; regulation of necroptotic process; protein heterooligomerization; MyD88-independent toll-like receptor signaling pathway; TRIF-dependent toll-like receptor signaling pathway; negative regulation of cysteine-type endopeptidase activity involved in apoptotic process
Sources:Amigo / QuickGO
Orthologs
Databases	NCBI: entry; OMA: entry
Species	Human	Mouse
Entrez	330	11796
Ensembl	ENSG00000023445	ENSMUSG00000032000
UniProt	Q13489	O08863
RefSeq (mRNA)	NM_001165; NM_182962	NM_007464
RefSeq (protein)	NP_001156; NP_892007	NP_031490
Location (UCSC)	Chr 11: 102.32 – 102.34 Mb	Chr 9: 7.85 – 7.87 Mb
PubMed search
- Wikidata
View/Edit Human	View/Edit Mouse

Baculoviral IAP repeat-containing protein3 (also known as cIAP2) is a protein that in humans is encoded by the BIRC3 gene.

cIAP2 is a member of the inhibitor of apoptosis family that inhibit apoptosis by interfering with the activation of caspases. The encoded protein inhibits apoptosis induced by serum deprivation but does not affect apoptosis resulting from exposure to menadione, a potent inducer of free radicals. The cIAP2 protein contains three BIR domains, a UBA domain, a CARD domain and a RING finger domain. Transcript variants encoding the same isoform have been identified.

== Interactions ==
Baculoviral IAP repeat-containing protein 3 has been shown to interact with:

- CASP9,
- RIPK1,
- TRAF1,
- TRAF2, and
- UBE2D2.
