= Serine protease HTRA2, mitochondrial =

Enzyme found in humans

HTRA2
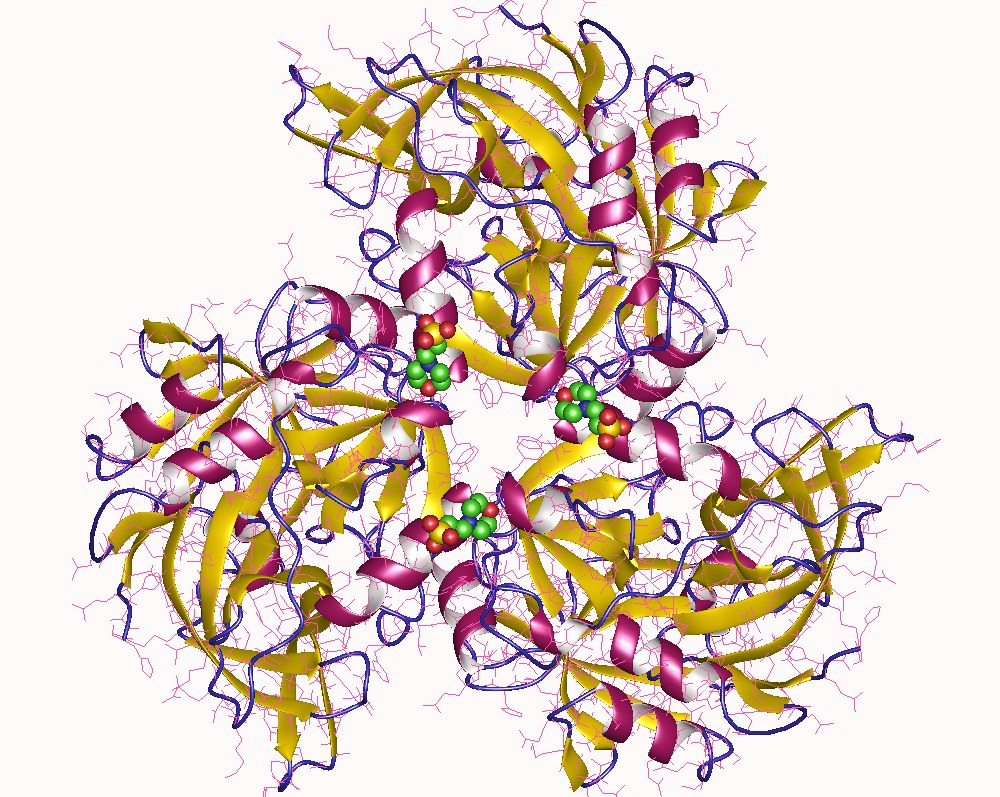

Identifiers
- Aliases: HTRA2, Htra2, AI481710, Omi, Prss25, mnd2, PARK13, HtrA serine peptidase 2, MGCA8
- External IDs: OMIM: 606441; MGI: 1928676; GeneCards: HTRA2
Available structures
PDB	Ortholog search: PDBe RCSB
PDB	List of PDB id codes 1LCY, 2PZD
Enzyme activity
EC #	BRENDA	ExPASy	KEGG	MetaCyc
3.4.21.108	↗	↗	↗	↗

Gene location (Human)
Chr.	Chromosome 2 (human)
Band	2p13.1	Start	74,529,596 bp
Band	2p13.1	End	74,533,350 bp

Gene location (Mouse)
Chr.	Chromosome 6 (mouse)
Band	6 C3|6 35.94 cM	Start	83,028,247 bp
Band	6 C3|6 35.94 cM	End	83,032,254 bp
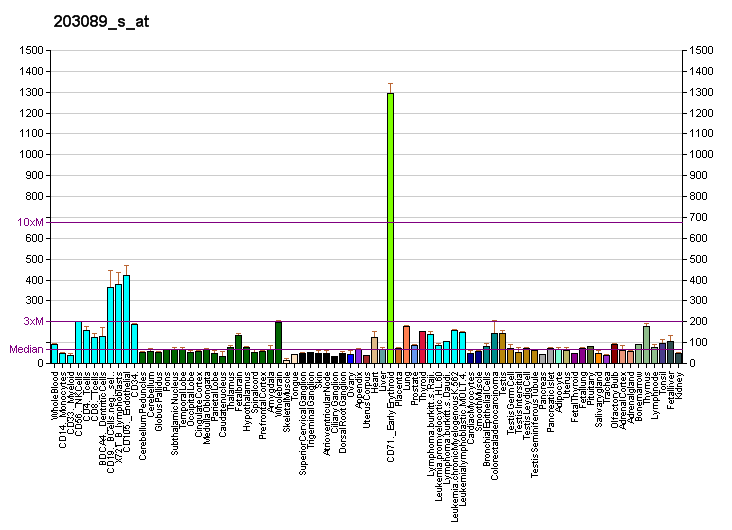

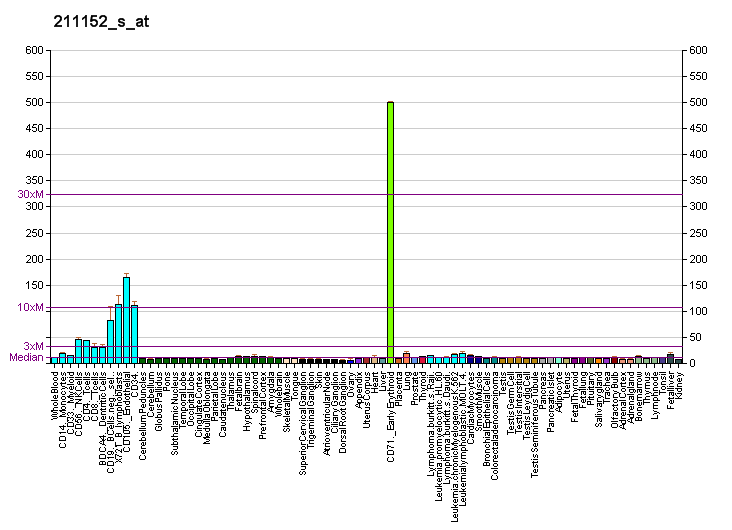
RNA expression pattern
Bgee	Human / Mouse (ortholog); Top expressed in: right coronary artery; trabecular bone; ganglionic eminence; apex of heart; mucosa of transverse colon; granulocyte; spleen; right ovary; ascending aorta; left coronary artery / Top expressed in: renal corpuscle; medullary collecting duct; fossa; endothelial cell of lymphatic vessel; condyle; fetal liver hematopoietic progenitor cell; ureter; seminal vesicula; endocardial cushion; sciatic nerve; More reference expression data
BioGPS	More reference expression data
Gene ontology
Molecular function	unfolded protein binding; protein binding; serine-type peptidase activity; serine-type endopeptidase activity; hydrolase activity; peptidase activity; identical protein binding
Cellular component	integral component of membrane; cytosol; endoplasmic reticulum membrane; membrane; mitochondrial membranes; mitochondrial intermembrane space; endoplasmic reticulum; mitochondrion; CD40 receptor complex; cytoplasmic side of plasma membrane; chromatin; cytoskeleton; nucleus; serine-type endopeptidase complex
Biological process	cellular response to retinoic acid; cellular response to heat; positive regulation of cell death; ceramide metabolic process; cellular response to interferon-beta; regulation of multicellular organism growth; positive regulation of protein targeting to mitochondrion; execution phase of apoptosis; adult locomotory behavior; cellular response to growth factor stimulus; pentacyclic triterpenoid metabolic process; mitochondrion organization; negative regulation of cell cycle; neuron development; protein autoprocessing; positive regulation of cysteine-type endopeptidase activity involved in apoptotic signaling pathway; negative regulation of cell death; intrinsic apoptotic signaling pathway; positive regulation of extrinsic apoptotic signaling pathway in absence of ligand; regulation of autophagy of mitochondrion; intrinsic apoptotic signaling pathway in response to DNA damage; positive regulation of apoptotic process; forebrain development; negative regulation of oxidative stress-induced intrinsic apoptotic signaling pathway; response to herbicide; adult walking behavior; negative regulation of neuron death; apoptotic process; ageing; proteolysis; positive regulation of mitochondrion organization; cellular response to oxidative stress; negative regulation of mitophagy in response to mitochondrial depolarization; positive regulation of cysteine-type endopeptidase activity involved in apoptotic process; protein homotrimerization
Sources:Amigo / QuickGO
Orthologs
Databases	NCBI: entry; OMA: entry
Species	Human	Mouse
Entrez	27429	64704
Ensembl	ENSG00000115317	ENSMUSG00000068329
UniProt	O43464	Q9JIY5
RefSeq (mRNA)	NM_013247; NM_145074; NM_001321727; NM_001321728	NM_019752
RefSeq (protein)	NP_001308656; NP_001308657; NP_037379; NP_659540	NP_062726
Location (UCSC)	Chr 2: 74.53 – 74.53 Mb	Chr 6: 83.03 – 83.03 Mb
PubMed search
- Wikidata
View/Edit Human	View/Edit Mouse

Serine protease HTRA2, mitochondrial is an enzyme that in humans is encoded by the HTRA2 gene. This protein is involved in caspase-dependent apoptosis and in Parkinson's disease.

== Structure ==
=== Gene ===
The gene HTRA2 encodes a serine protease. The human gene has 8 exons and locates at chromosome band 2p12.

=== Protein ===
Protein HtrA2, also known as Omi, is a mitochondrially-located serine protease. The human protein Serine protease HTRA2, mitochondrial is 49kDa in size and composed of 458 amino acids. The peptide fragment of 1-31 amino acid is the mitochondrial transition sequence, fragment 32-133 amino acid is propertied, and 134-458 is the mature protein Serine protease HTRA2, mitochondrial, and its theoretical pI of this protein is 6.12. HtrA2 shows similarities with DegS, a bacterial protease present in the periplasm of gram-negative bacteria. Structurally, HtrA2 is a trimeric molecule with central protease domains and a carboxy-terminal PDZ domain, which is characteristic of the HtrA family. The PDZ domain preferentially binds C-terminus of the protein substrate and modulate the proteolytic activity of the trypsin-like protease domain.

== Function ==
The high-temperature requirement (HtrA) family are conserved evolutionarily and these oligomeric serine proteases has been classified in family S1B of the PA protease clan in the MEROPS protease database. The protease activity of the HtrA member HtrA2/Omi is required for mitochondrial homeostasis in mice and humans and inactivating mutations associated with neurodegenerative disorders such as Parkinson's disease. Moreover, HtrA2/Omi is released in the cytosol from the mitochondria during apoptosis and uses its four most N-terminal amino acids to mimic a caspase and be recruited by inhibitor of apoptosis protein (IAP) caspase inhibitors such as XIAP and CIAP1/2. Once bound, the serine protease cleaves the IAP, reducing the cell's inhibition to caspase activation. In summary, HTRA2/Omi contributes to apoptosis through both caspase-dependent and -independent pathways.

== Clinical significance ==
The members of the HtrA family of proteases have been shown playing critical roles in cell physiology and being involved in several pathological processes including cancer and neurodegenerative disease. Strong evidences supported HtrA2's involvement in oncogenesis. This protein is widely expressed in a variety of cancer cell lines, Analysis of biopsy samples showed changes in expression of HtrA2 in cancer tissues compared with normal tissues.

HtrA2 has recently been identified as a gene related to Parkinson's disease. Mutations in Htra2 have been found in patients with Parkinson's disease. Additionally, mice lacking HtrA2 have a parkinsonian phenotype. This suggests that HtrA2 is linked to Parkinson's disease progression in humans and mice.

== Interactions ==
HtrA serine peptidase 2 has been shown to interact with MAPK14, XIAP and BIRC2.
