= NAIP (gene) =

Protein and coding gene in humans

Available structures
PDB	Ortholog search: PDBe RCSB
PDB	List of PDB id codes 2VM5

Identifiers
- Aliases: NAIP, BIRC1, NLRB1, psiNLR family, apoptosis inhibitory protein, NLR family apoptosis inhibitory protein
- External IDs: OMIM: 600355; MGI: 1298226; HomoloGene: 136092; GeneCards: NAIP; OMA:NAIP - orthologs

Gene location (Human)
Chr.	Chromosome 5 (human)
Band	5q13.2	Start	70,968,166 bp
Band	5q13.2	End	71,025,339 bp

Gene location (Mouse)
Chr.	Chromosome 13 (mouse)
Band	13 D1|13 53.01 cM	Start	100,280,571 bp
Band	13 D1|13 53.01 cM	End	100,338,600 bp
RNA expression pattern
Bgee	Human / Mouse (ortholog); Top expressed in: monocyte; spleen; granulocyte; appendix; bone marrow cells; right uterine tube; epithelium of colon; ganglionic eminence; right lung; blood / Top expressed in: granulocyte; left colon; ileum; Paneth cell; jejunum; epithelium of small intestine; intestinal villus; duodenum; urethra; male urethra; More reference expression data
BioGPS	n/a
Gene ontology
Molecular function	peptidase inhibitor activity; nucleotide binding; cysteine-type endopeptidase inhibitor activity; metal ion binding; ubiquitin-protein transferase activity; protein binding; ATP binding; cysteine-type endopeptidase inhibitor activity involved in apoptotic process
Cellular component	perikaryon; soma; basolateral plasma membrane; neuron projection; cytoplasm; nucleus
Biological process	negative regulation of neuron apoptotic process; negative regulation of cysteine-type endopeptidase activity involved in apoptotic process; response to amino acid; negative regulation of peptidase activity; immune system process; nervous system development; response to axon injury; innate immune response; inflammatory response; apoptotic process; protein ubiquitination; positive regulation of canonical Wnt signaling pathway; mitotic spindle assembly; inhibition of cysteine-type endopeptidase activity involved in apoptotic process; negative regulation of apoptotic process
Sources:Amigo / QuickGO
Orthologs
Species	Human	Mouse
Entrez	4671	17948
Ensembl	ENSG00000278613; ENSG00000276068; ENSG00000249437	ENSMUSG00000078945
UniProt	Q13075	Q9QUK4
RefSeq (mRNA)	NM_004536; NM_022892; NM_001346870	NM_001126182; NM_010872
RefSeq (protein)	NP_001333799; NP_004527; NP_075043	NP_001119654; NP_035002
Location (UCSC)	Chr 5: 70.97 – 71.03 Mb	Chr 13: 100.28 – 100.34 Mb
PubMed search
- Wikidata
View/Edit Human	View/Edit Mouse

Baculoviral IAP repeat-containing protein 1 is a protein that in humans is encoded by the NAIP gene.

This gene is part of a 500 kb inverted duplication on chromosome 5q13. This duplicated region contains at least four genes and repetitive elements which make it prone to rearrangements and deletions. The repetitiveness and complexity of the sequence have also caused difficulty in determining the organization of this genomic region. This copy of the gene is full length; additional copies with truncations and internal deletions are also present in this region of chromosome 5q13. It is thought that this gene is a modifier of spinal muscular atrophy caused by mutations in a neighboring gene, SMN1. The protein encoded by this gene contains regions of homology to two baculovirus inhibitor of apoptosis proteins, and it is able to suppress apoptosis induced by various signals. Alternatively spliced transcript variants encoding distinct isoforms have been found for this gene.
