= Z-FA-FMK =

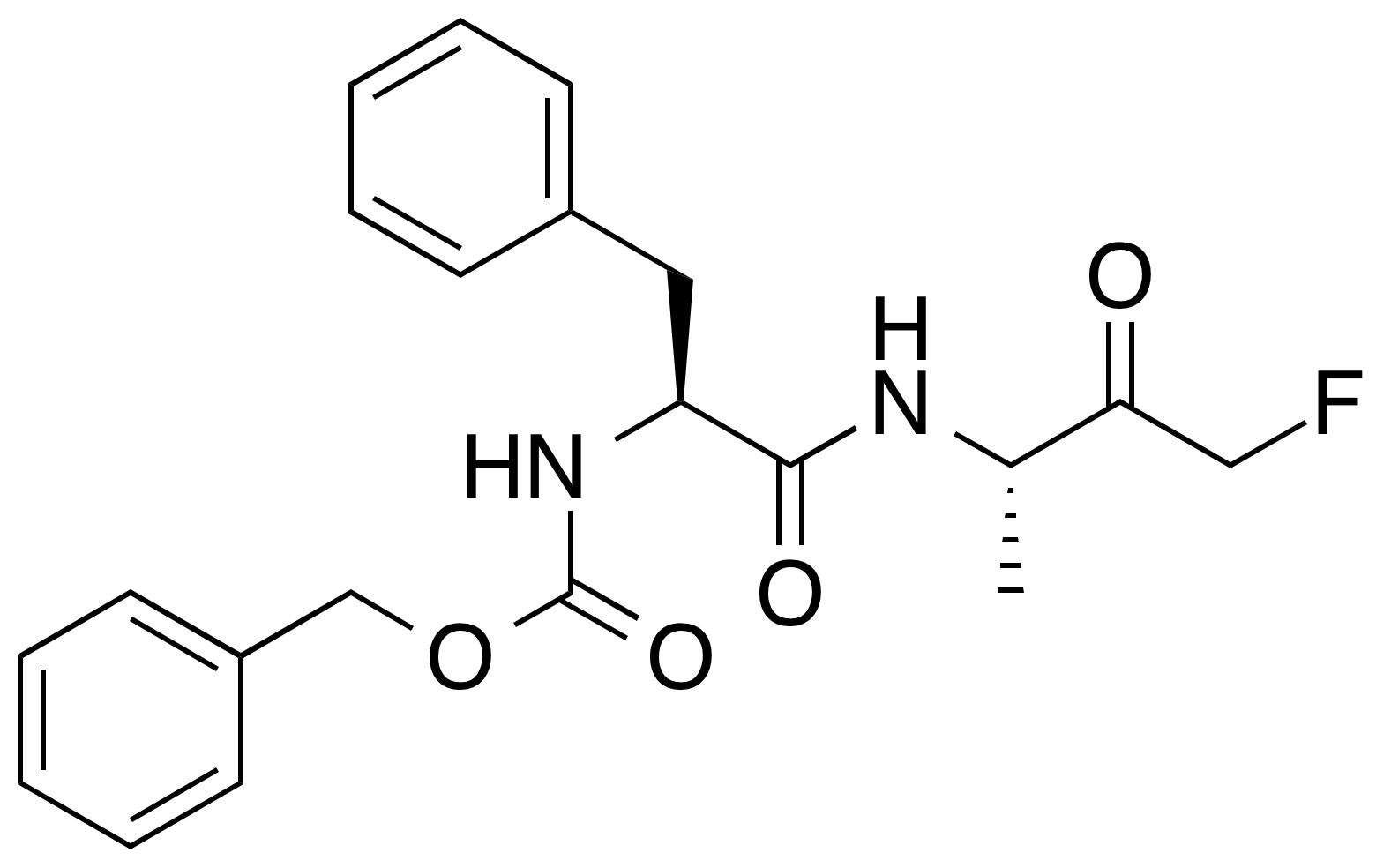

Names
- IUPAC name N-[(1S)-2-[(3-Fluoro-1-methyl-2-oxopropyl)amino]-2-oxo-1-(phenylmethyl)ethyl]-,phenylmethyl ester
- Other names Z-Phe-Ala-Fluoromethyl Ketone

Identifiers
CAS Number	197855-65-5
3D model (JSmol)	Interactive image; Interactive image
ChEMBL	ChEMBL5271003
ChemSpider	108843
IUPHAR/BPS	11257
PubChem CID	122019; 6915837
UNII	34O3P3306Z
- InChI: InChI=1S/C21H23FN2O4/c1-15(19(25)13-22)23-20(26)18(12-16-8-4-2-5-9-16)24-21(27)28-14-17-10-6-3-7-11-17/h2-11,15,18H,12-14H2,1H3,(H,23,26)(H,24,27) Key: ASXVEBPEZMSPHB-UHFFFAOYSA-N; Key: ASXVEBPEZMSPHB-PKHIMPSTSA-N
- SMILES: FCC(=O)C(NC(=O)C(NC(=O)OCc1ccccc1)Cc2ccccc2)C; CC(C(=O)CF)NC(=O)[C@H](CC1=CC=CC=C1)NC(=O)OCC2=CC=CC=C2

Properties
Chemical formula	C_{21}H_{23}FN_{2}O_{4}
Molar mass	386.423 g·mol^{−1}
Density	1.207 g/cm^{3}
- Except where otherwise noted, data are given for materials in their standard state (at 25 °C [77 °F], 100 kPa). Infobox references

Z-FA-FMK, abbreviating for benzyloxycarbonyl-phenylalanyl-alanyl-fluoromethyl ketone, is a very potent irreversible inhibitor of cysteine proteases, including cathepsins B, L, and S, cruzain, and papain. It also selectively inhibits effector caspases 2, 3, 6, and 7 but not caspases 8 and 10. This compound has been shown to block the production of IL1-α, IL1-β, and TNF-α induced by LPS in macrophages by inhibiting NF-κB pathways.
