= Caspase 14 =

Enzyme found in humans

CASP14

Identifiers
- Aliases: CASP14, caspase 14, ARCI12
- External IDs: OMIM: 605848; MGI: 1335092; GeneCards: CASP14

Gene location (Human)
Chr.	Chromosome 19 (human)
Band	19p13.12	Start	15,049,480 bp
Band	19p13.12	End	15,058,293 bp

Gene location (Mouse)
Chr.	Chromosome 10 (mouse)
Band	10|10 C1	Start	78,547,825 bp
Band	10|10 C1	End	78,554,128 bp
RNA expression pattern
Bgee	Human / Mouse (ortholog); Top expressed in: skin of abdomen; skin of leg; skin of arm; vulva; testicle; vagina; human penis; skin of thigh; tibialis anterior muscle; mucosa of ileum / Top expressed in: lip; esophagus; skin of back; umbilical cord; skin of abdomen; skin of external ear; left colon; sexually immature organism; epidermis; cornea; More reference expression data
BioGPS	n/a
Gene ontology
Molecular function	peptidase activity; cysteine-type endopeptidase activity; cysteine-type peptidase activity; protein binding; hydrolase activity; endopeptidase activity; cysteine-type endopeptidase activity involved in execution phase of apoptosis; cysteine-type endopeptidase activity involved in apoptotic process
Cellular component	cytoplasm; keratin filament; nucleus; cytosol; mitochondrion
Biological process	cornification; cell differentiation; keratinization; proteolysis; epidermis development; execution phase of apoptosis; apoptotic process; intrinsic apoptotic signaling pathway in response to DNA damage
Sources:Amigo / QuickGO
Orthologs
Databases	NCBI: entry; OMA: entry
Species	Human	Mouse
Entrez	23581	12365
Ensembl	ENSG00000105141	ENSMUSG00000005355
UniProt	P31944	O89094
RefSeq (mRNA)	NM_012114	NM_009809
RefSeq (protein)	NP_036246	NP_033939
Location (UCSC)	Chr 19: 15.05 – 15.06 Mb	Chr 10: 78.55 – 78.55 Mb
PubMed search
- Wikidata
View/Edit Human	View/Edit Mouse

Caspase 14 is an enzyme that in humans is encoded by the CASP14 gene. Orthologs of this gene also exist in other mammals, such as sirenians and cetaceans, though they are inactivated in these two clades. Manatees, which are sirenians, retain some functional CASP14 genes.

The CASP14 gene encodes a member of the cysteine-aspartic acid protease (caspase) family. Sequential activation of caspases plays a central role in the execution-phase of cell apoptosis. Caspases exist as inactive proenzymes which undergo proteolytic processing at conserved aspartic residues to produce two subunits, large and small, that dimerize to form the active enzyme. This caspase has been shown to be processed and activated by caspase 8 and caspase 10 in vitro, and by anti-Fas agonist antibody or TNF-related apoptosis inducing ligand in vivo. The expression and processing of this caspase may be involved in keratinocyte terminal differentiation, which is important for the formation of the skin barrier.

According to the Human Protein Atlas, the CASP14 protein is enriched in human skin and mainly expressed in the upper layers of the epidermis. The protein is mainly localised to the cytosol according to the Cell Atlas.

== See also ==
- The Proteolysis Map
- Caspase
