= Caspase 6 =

Enzyme found in humans

CASP6
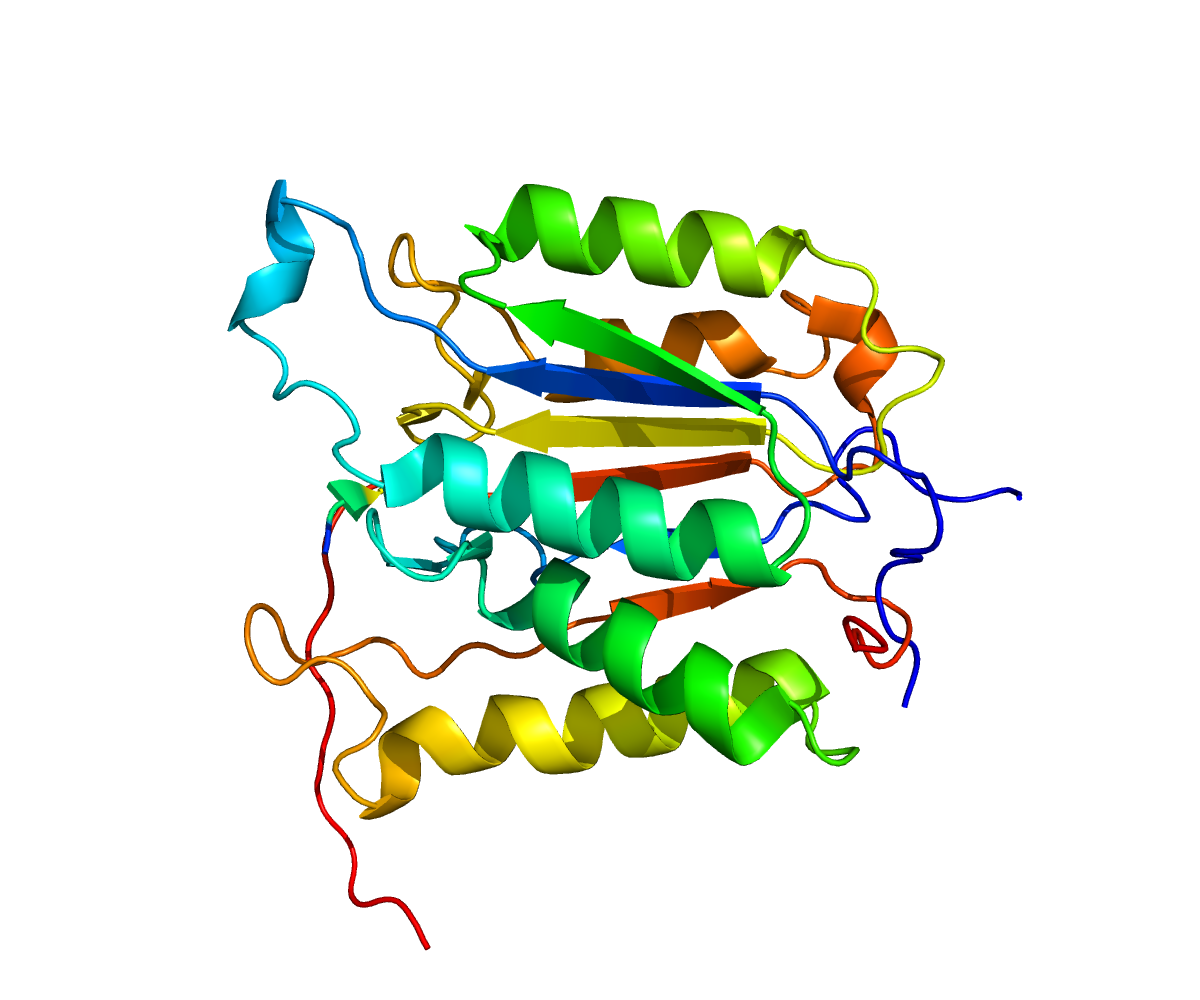

Identifiers
- Aliases: CASP6, MCH2, Caspase 6, CSP-6
- External IDs: OMIM: 601532; MGI: 1312921; GeneCards: CASP6
Available structures
PDB	Ortholog search: PDBe RCSB
PDB	List of PDB id codes 2WDP, 3K7E, 3NKF, 3NR2, 3OD5, 3P45, 3P4U, 3QNW, 3S70, 3S8E, 3V6L, 3V6M, 4EJF, 4FXO, 4HVA, 4IYR, 4N5D, 4N6G, 4N7J, 4N7M, 4NBK, 4NBL, 4NBN
Enzyme activity
EC #	BRENDA	ExPASy	KEGG	MetaCyc
3.4.22.59	↗	↗	↗	↗

Gene location (Human)
Chr.	Chromosome 4 (human)
Band	4q25	Start	109,688,622 bp
Band	4q25	End	109,703,583 bp

Gene location (Mouse)
Chr.	Chromosome 3 (mouse)
Band	3|3 G3	Start	129,695,074 bp
Band	3|3 G3	End	129,707,752 bp
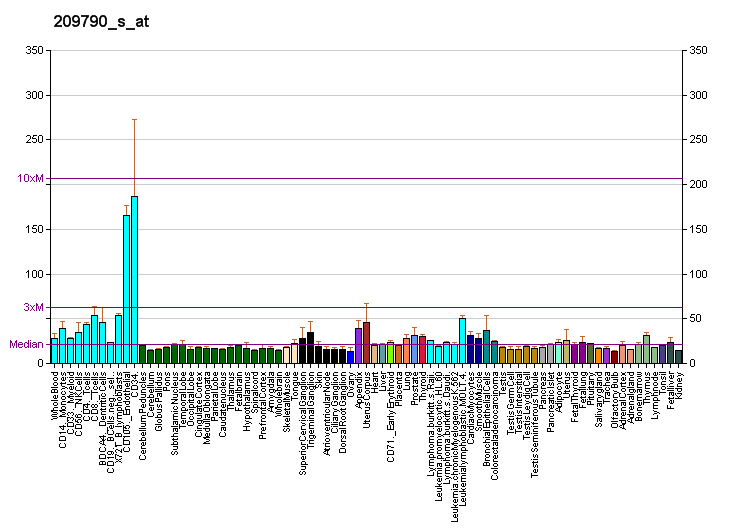

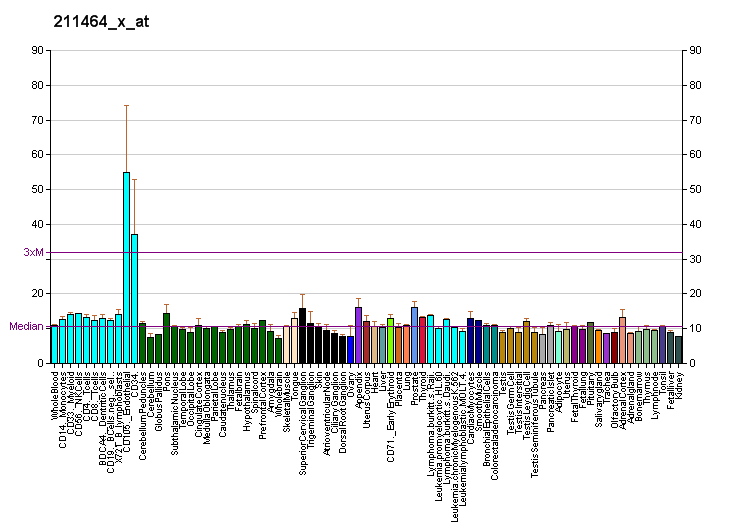
RNA expression pattern
Bgee	Human / Mouse (ortholog); Top expressed in: rectum; mucosa of transverse colon; oocyte; secondary oocyte; jejunal mucosa; duodenum; pancreatic ductal cell; mucosa of sigmoid colon; buccal mucosa cell; islet of Langerhans / Top expressed in: gastric mucosa; epithelium of stomach; mucous cell of stomach; pyloric antrum; duodenum; jejunum; endocardial cushion; migratory enteric neural crest cell; yolk sac; parotid gland; More reference expression data
BioGPS	More reference expression data
Gene ontology
Molecular function	peptidase activity; cysteine-type endopeptidase activity; cysteine-type peptidase activity; endopeptidase activity; protein binding; hydrolase activity; identical protein binding; cysteine-type endopeptidase activity involved in execution phase of apoptosis; cysteine-type endopeptidase activity involved in apoptotic process
Cellular component	cytosol; nucleoplasm; cytoplasm
Biological process	epithelial cell differentiation; proteolysis; apoptotic process; regulation of apoptotic process; execution phase of apoptosis; cellular response to staurosporine
Sources:Amigo / QuickGO
Orthologs
Databases	NCBI: entry; OMA: entry
Species	Human	Mouse
Entrez	839	12368
Ensembl	ENSG00000138794	ENSMUSG00000027997
UniProt	P55212	O08738
RefSeq (mRNA)	NM_001226; NM_032992	NM_009811
RefSeq (protein)	NP_001217; NP_116787	NP_033941
Location (UCSC)	Chr 4: 109.69 – 109.7 Mb	Chr 3: 129.7 – 129.71 Mb
PubMed search
- Wikidata
View/Edit Human	View/Edit Mouse

Caspase-6 is an enzyme that in humans is encoded by the CASP6 gene. CASP6 orthologs have been identified in numerous mammals for which complete genome data are available. Unique orthologs are also present in birds, lizards, lissamphibians, and teleosts. Caspase-6 has known functions in apoptosis, early immune response and neurodegeneration in Huntington's and Alzheimer's disease.

== Function ==
This gene encodes a protein that is a member of the cysteine-aspartic acid protease (caspase) family. Sequential activation of caspases plays a central role in the execution-phase of cell apoptosis. Caspases exist as inactive proenzymes that undergo proteolytic processing at conserved aspartic residues to produce two subunits, large and small, that dimerize to form the active enzyme. This protein is processed by caspases 7, 8 and 10, and is thought to function as a downstream enzyme in the caspase activation cascade. Caspase 6 can also undergo self-processing without other members of the caspase family. Alternative splicing of this gene results in two transcript variants that encode different isoforms.

Caspase-6 plays a role in the early immune response via de-repression. It reduces the expression of the immunosuppressant cytokine interleukin-10 and cleaves the macrophage suppressing IRAK-M.

With respect to neurodegeneration, caspase-6 cleaves HTT in Huntington's and APP in Alzheimer's disease. Resulting in both cases in protein aggregation of the fragments.

== Interactions ==
Caspase 6 has been shown to interact with Caspase 8.

== See also ==
- The Proteolysis Map
- Caspase
