= Caspase 3 =

Protein found in humans

CASP3
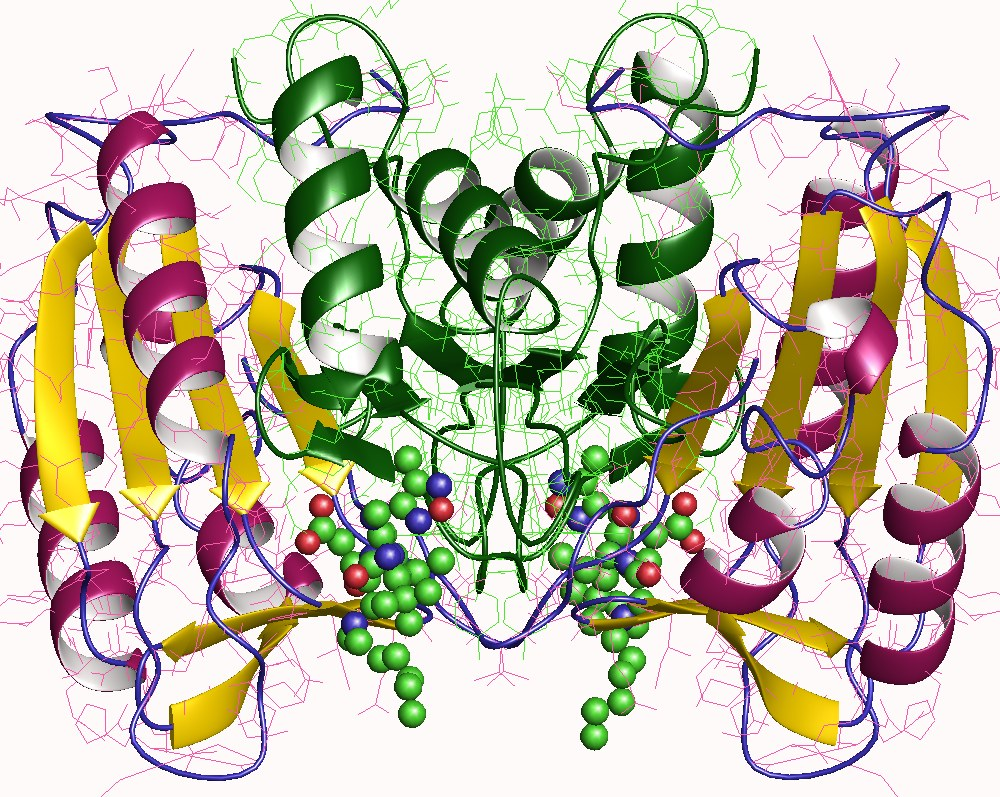

Identifiers
- Aliases: CASP3, CPP32, CPP32B, SCA-1, caspase 3
- External IDs: OMIM: 600636; MGI: 107739; GeneCards: CASP3
Available structures
PDB	Ortholog search: PDBe RCSB
PDB	List of PDB id codes 1CP3, 1GFW, 1I3O, 1NME, 1NMQ, 1NMS, 1PAU, 1QX3, 1RE1, 1RHJ, 1RHK, 1RHM, 1RHQ, 1RHR, 1RHU, 2C1E, 2C2K, 2C2M, 2C2O, 2CDR, 2CJX, 2CJY, 2CNK, 2CNL, 2CNN, 2CNO, 2DKO, 2H5I, 2H5J, 2H65, 2J30, 2J31, 2J32, 2J33, 2XYG, 2XYH, 2XYP, 2XZD, 2XZT, 2Y0B, 3DEH, 3DEI, 3DEJ, 3DEK, 3EDQ, 3GJQ, 3GJR, 3GJS, 3GJT, 3H0E, 3ITN, 3KJF, 3PCX, 3PD0, 3PD1, 4DCJ, 4DCO, 4DCP, 4EHA, 4EHD, 4EHF, 4EHH, 4EHK, 4EHL, 4EHN, 4JJE, 4JQY, 4JQZ, 4JR0, 4PRY, 4PS0, 4QTX, 4QTY, 4QU0, 4QU5, 4QU8, 4QU9, 4QUA, 4QUB, 4QUD, 4QUE, 4QUG, 4QUH, 4QUI, 4QUJ, 4QUL, 5IC4
Enzyme activity
EC #	BRENDA	ExPASy	KEGG	MetaCyc
3.4.22.56	↗	↗	↗	↗

Gene location (Mouse)
Chr.	Chromosome 8 (mouse)
Band	8 B1.1|8 26.39 cM	Start	47,070,326 bp
Band	8 B1.1|8 26.39 cM	End	47,092,724 bp
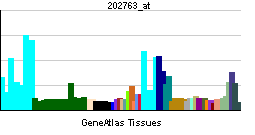
RNA expression pattern
Bgee	Human / Mouse (ortholog); n/a / Top expressed in: medial ganglionic eminence; barrel cortex; Rostral migratory stream; neural tube; trigeminal ganglion; renal corpuscle; granulocyte; tail of embryo; epiblast; superior cervical ganglion
BioGPS	More reference expression data
Gene ontology
Molecular function	cysteine-type peptidase activity; peptidase activity; protein binding; phospholipase A2 activator activity; cyclin-dependent protein serine/threonine kinase inhibitor activity; cysteine-type endopeptidase activity involved in apoptotic process; cysteine-type endopeptidase activity involved in execution phase of apoptosis; cysteine-type endopeptidase activity; hydrolase activity; cysteine-type endopeptidase activator activity involved in apoptotic process; aspartic-type endopeptidase activity; protease binding; death receptor binding; protein-containing complex binding; cysteine-type endopeptidase activity involved in apoptotic signaling pathway
Cellular component	cytoplasm; cytosol; nucleoplasm; death-inducing signaling complex; membrane raft; nucleus; soma
Biological process	cellular response to organic substance; neuron apoptotic process; cell fate commitment; response to estradiol; intracellular signal transduction; response to hypoxia; response to amino acid; apoptotic DNA fragmentation; response to organic cyclic compound; negative regulation of cyclin-dependent protein serine/threonine kinase activity; response to antibiotic; platelet formation; protein processing; response to nicotine; response to metal ion; negative regulation of cell cycle; wound healing; response to glucocorticoid; cellular response to organic cyclic compound; B cell homeostasis; negative regulation of apoptotic process; hearing; response to glucose; response to organic substance; hippo signaling; glial cell apoptotic process; keratinocyte differentiation; proteolysis; cellular response to DNA damage stimulus; T cell homeostasis; response to tumor necrosis factor; negative regulation of activated T cell proliferation; development of the heart; response to lipopolysaccharide; positive regulation of neuron apoptotic process; response to wounding; neuron differentiation; extrinsic apoptotic signaling pathway in absence of ligand; learning or memory; positive regulation of apoptotic process; erythrocyte differentiation; apoptotic signaling pathway; negative regulation of B cell proliferation; response to cobalt ion; hippocampus development; response to UV; response to X-ray; response to hydrogen peroxide; regulation of macroautophagy; neurotrophin TRK receptor signaling pathway; execution phase of apoptosis; intrinsic apoptotic signaling pathway in response to osmotic stress; cellular response to staurosporine; apoptotic process; cytokine-mediated signaling pathway; activation of cysteine-type endopeptidase activity involved in apoptotic process; positive regulation of catalytic activity; luteolysis; axonal fasciculation; striated muscle cell differentiation; leukocyte apoptotic process; regulation of protein stability; positive regulation of amyloid-beta formation; anterior neural tube closure
Sources:Amigo / QuickGO
Orthologs
Databases	NCBI: entry; OMA: entry
Species	Human	Mouse
Entrez	836	12367
Ensembl	ENSG00000164305	ENSMUSG00000031628
UniProt	P42574	P70677
RefSeq (mRNA)	NM_004346; NM_032991	NM_009810; NM_001284409
RefSeq (protein)	NP_004337; NP_116786; NP_001341706; NP_001341708; NP_001341709 NP_001341710; NP_001341711; NP_001341712; NP_001341713	NP_001271338; NP_033940
Location (UCSC)	n/a	Chr 8: 47.07 – 47.09 Mb
PubMed search
- Wikidata
View/Edit Human	View/Edit Mouse

Caspase-3 is a caspase protein that interacts with caspase-8 and caspase-9. It is encoded by the CASP3 gene. CASP3 orthologs have been identified in numerous mammals for which complete genome data are available. Unique orthologs are also present in birds, lizards, lissamphibians, and teleosts.

The CASP3 protein is a member of the cysteine-aspartic acid protease (caspase) family. Sequential activation of caspases plays a central role in the execution-phase of cell apoptosis. Caspases exist as inactive proenzymes that undergo proteolytic processing at conserved aspartic residues to produce two subunits, large and small, that dimerize to form the active enzyme. This protein cleaves and activates caspases 6 and 7; and the protein itself is processed and activated by caspases 8, 9, and 10. It is the predominant caspase involved in the cleavage of amyloid-beta 4A precursor protein, which is associated with neuronal death in Alzheimer's disease. Alternative splicing of this gene results in two transcript variants that encode the same protein.

Caspase-3 shares many of the typical characteristics common to all currently-known caspases. For example, its active site contains a cysteine residue (Cys-163) and histidine residue (His-121) that stabilize the peptide bond cleavage of a protein sequence to the carboxy-terminal side of an aspartic acid when it is part of a particular 4-amino acid sequence. This specificity allows caspases to be incredibly selective, with a 20,000-fold preference for aspartic acid over glutamic acid. A key feature of caspases in the cell is that they are present as zymogens, termed procaspases, which are inactive until a biochemical change causes their activation. Each procaspase has an N-terminal large subunit of about 20 kDa followed by a smaller subunit of about 10 kDa, called p20 and p10, respectively.

== Structure ==
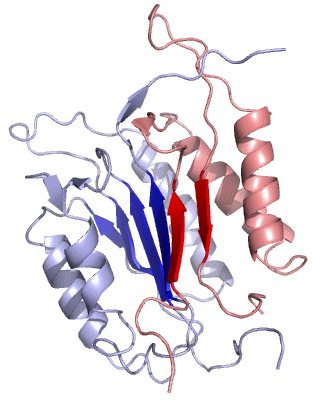
The p12 (pink) and p17 (light blue) subunits of caspase-3 with the beta-sheet structures of each in red and blue, respectively; image generated in Pymol from 1rhm.pdb

Caspase-3, in particular, (also known as CPP32/Yama/apopain) is formed from a 32 kDa zymogen that is cleaved into 17 kDa and 12 kDa subunits. When the procaspase is cleaved at a particular residue, the active heterotetramer can then be formed by hydrophobic interactions, causing four anti-parallel beta-sheets from p17 and two from p12 to come together to make a heterodimer, which in turn interacts with another heterodimer to form the full 12-stranded beta-sheet structure surrounded by alpha-helices that is unique to caspases. When the heterodimers align head-to-tail with each other, an active site is positioned at each end of the molecule formed by residues from both participating subunits, though the necessary Cys-163 and His-121 residues are found on the p17 (larger) subunit.

== Function ==
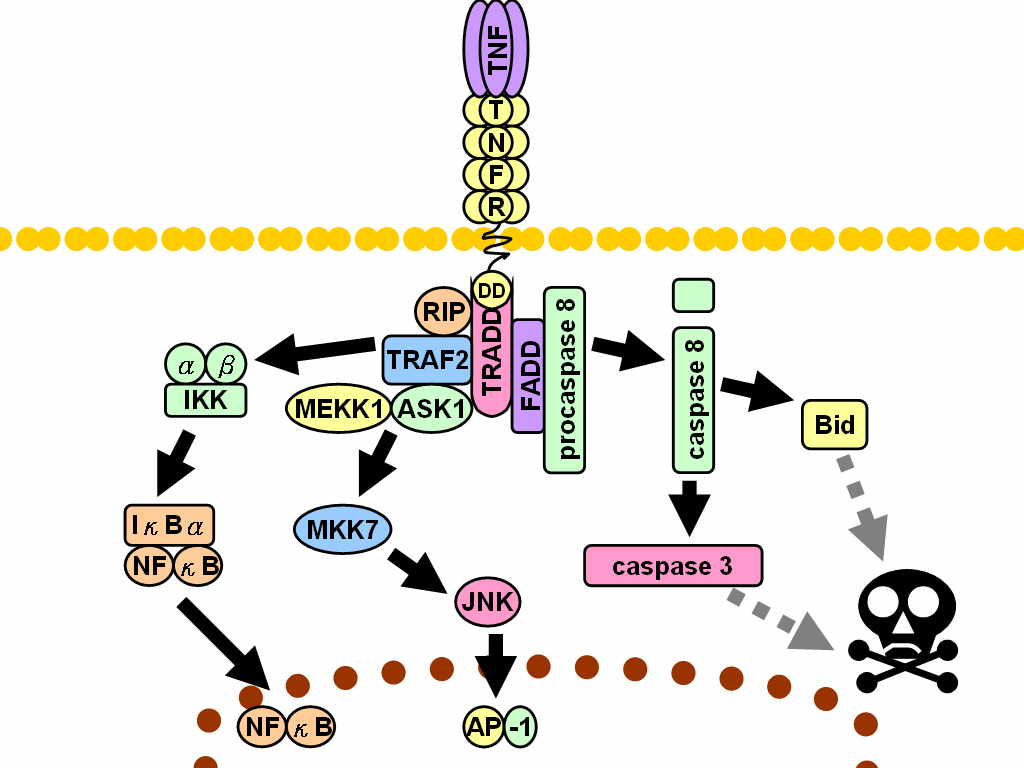
Signaling pathway of TNF-R1. Dashed grey lines represent multiple steps

Caspase-3 is a crucial executioner protease in the apoptotic pathway, responsible for orchestrating the dismantling of cellular components during programmed cell death. Synthesized as an inactive zymogen, caspase-3 is activated by upstream initiator caspases-such as caspase-8 and caspase-9 through proteolytic cleavage, which exposes its active site and enables it to cleave a broad range of cellular substrates, including structural proteins, cell cycle regulators, and DNA repair enzymes. This proteolytic activity leads to hallmark features of apoptosis, such as chromatin condensation, DNA fragmentation, and the formation of apoptotic bodies, facilitating the orderly removal of dying cells. Caspase-3's function is tightly regulated by post-translational modifications and interactions with other cellular proteins, ensuring that apoptosis proceeds only under appropriate physiological conditions. Its essential role is underscored by its requirement for normal development and tissue homeostasis, and dysregulation of caspase-3 activity has been implicated in various diseases, including neurodegenerative disorders and cancer.

Caspase-3 has been found to be necessary for normal brain development as well as its typical role in apoptosis, where it is responsible for chromatin condensation and DNA fragmentation. Elevated levels of a fragment of Caspase-3, p17, in the bloodstream is a sign of a recent myocardial infarction. It is now being shown that caspase-3 may play a role in embryonic and hematopoietic stem cell differentiation.

== Enzymatic activity ==
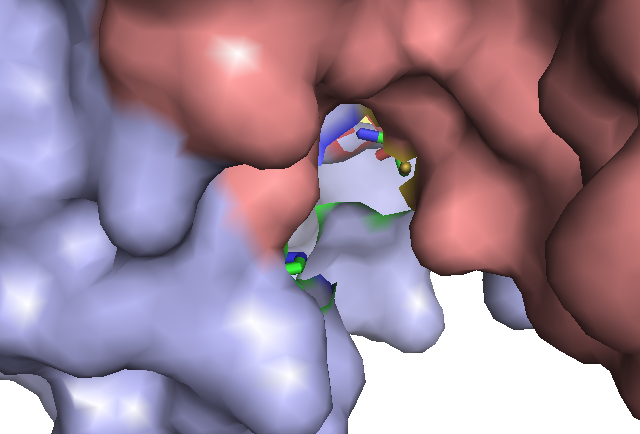
Cys-285 (yellow) and His-237 (green and dark blue) in the active site of caspase-3, p12 subunit in pink and p17 subunit in light blue; image generated in Pymol from 1rhr.pdb

=== Substrate specificity ===
Under normal circumstances, caspases recognize tetra-peptide sequences on their substrates and hydrolyze peptide bonds after aspartic acid residues. Caspase 3 and caspase 7 share similar substrate specificity by recognizing tetra-peptide motif Asp-x-x-Asp. The C-terminal Asp is absolutely required while variations at other three positions can be tolerated. Caspase substrate specificity has been widely used in caspase based inhibitor and drug design.

=== Mechanism of catalysis ===
The catalytic site of caspase-3 involves the thiol group of Cys-163 and the imidazole ring of His-121. His-121 stabilizes the carbonyl group of the key aspartate residue, while Cys-163 attacks to ultimately cleave the peptide bond. Cys-163 and Gly-238 also function to stabilize the tetrahedral transition state of the substrate-enzyme complex through hydrogen bonding. In vitro, caspase-3 has been found to prefer the peptide sequence DEVDG (Asp-Glu-Val-Asp-Gly) with cleavage occurring on the carboxy side of the second aspartic acid residue (between D and G). Caspase-3 is active over a broad pH range that is slightly higher (more basic) than many of the other executioner caspases. This broad range indicates that caspase-3 will be fully active under normal and apoptotic cell conditions.

== Regulation ==
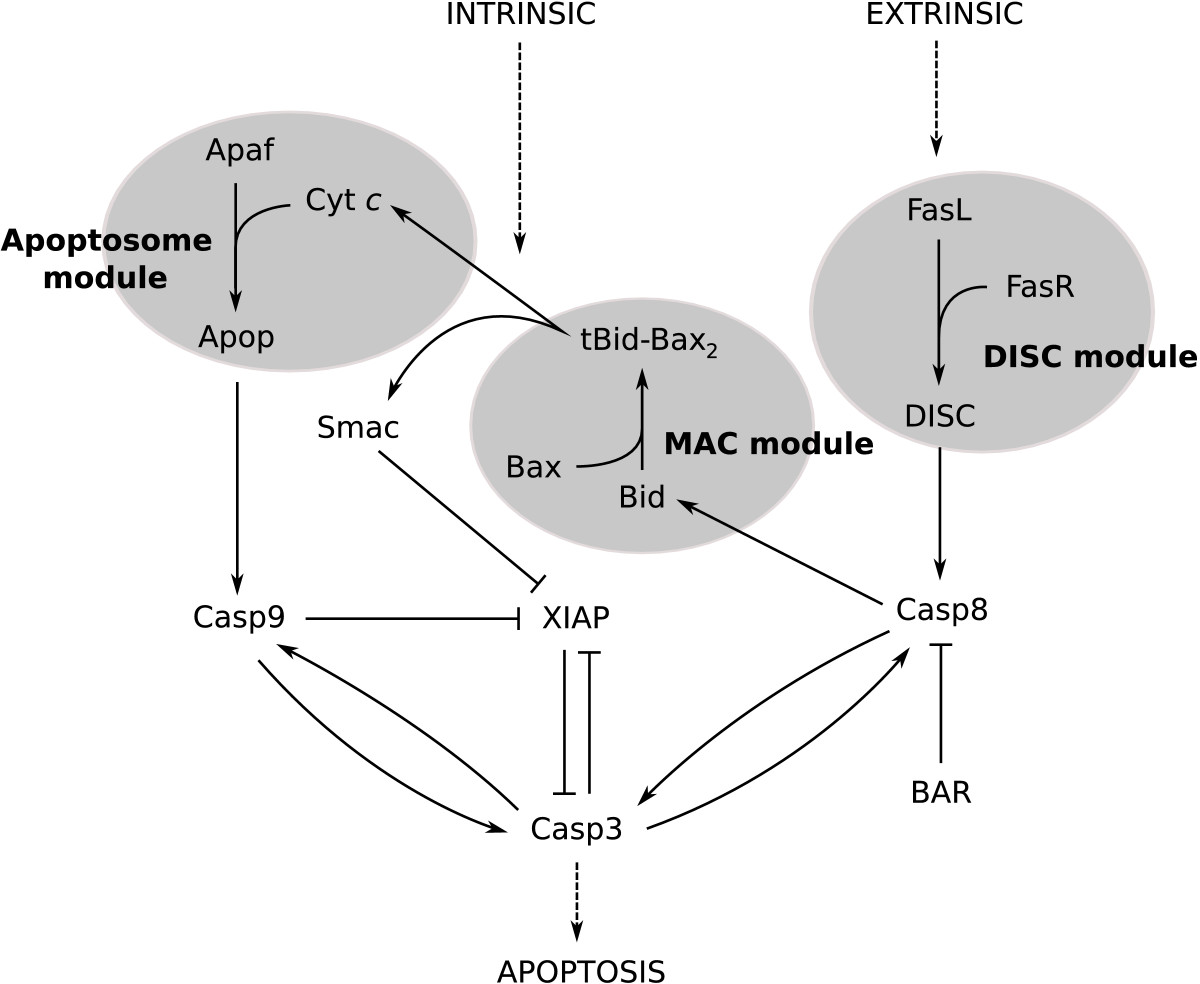
Pathways leading to caspase 3 activation.

=== Activation ===
Caspase-3 is activated in the apoptotic cell both by extrinsic (death ligand) and intrinsic (mitochondrial) pathways. The zymogen feature of caspase-3 is necessary because if unregulated, caspase activity would kill cells indiscriminately. As an executioner caspase, the caspase-3 zymogen has virtually no activity until it is cleaved by an initiator caspase after apoptotic signaling events have occurred. One such signaling event is the introduction of granzyme B, which can activate initiator caspases, into cells targeted for apoptosis by killer T cells. This extrinsic activation then triggers the hallmark caspase cascade characteristic of the apoptotic pathway, in which caspase-3 plays a dominant role. In intrinsic activation, cytochrome c from the mitochondria works in combination with caspase-9, apoptosis-activating factor 1 (Apaf-1), and ATP to process procaspase-3. These molecules are sufficient to activate caspase-3 in vitro, but other regulatory proteins are necessary in vivo. Mangosteen (Garcinia mangostana) extract has been shown to inhibit the activation of caspase 3 in B-amyloid treated human neuronal cells.

=== Inhibition ===
One means of caspase inhibition is through the IAP (inhibitor of apoptosis) protein family, which includes c-IAP1, c-IAP2, XIAP, and ML-IAP. XIAP binds and inhibits initiator caspase-9, which is directly involved in the activation of executioner caspase-3. During the caspase cascade, however, caspase-3 functions to inhibit XIAP activity by cleaving caspase-9 at a specific site, preventing XIAP from being able to bind to inhibit caspase-9 activity.

== Interactions ==
Caspase 3 has been shown to interact with:

- CASP8
- NMT2
- CFLAR
- DCC
- GroEL
- HCLS1
- Survivin
- TRAF3
- XIAP
- NFE2L2

== See also ==
- The Proteolysis Map
- Caspase
- PAC-1
