= Caspase 13 =

Bovine protein

Identifiers
- Organism: Bos taurus
- Symbol: CASP13
- Alt. symbols: CASP4
- Entrez: 338039
- RefSeq (mRNA): NM_176638.5
- RefSeq (Prot): NP_788811.1
- UniProt: O75601

Other data
- EC number: 3.4.22.57
- Chromosome: 15: 3.25 - 3.27 Mb
Search for
- Structures: Swiss-model
- Domains: InterPro

Caspase 13 or ERICE ("evolutionarily related interleukin-1β converting enzyme") is a protein that was identified in cattle. It belongs to a family of enzymes called caspases that cleave their substrates at C-terminal aspartic acid residues. Although this enzyme was originally reported as a human caspase that could be activated by caspase 8, later studies confirmed the gene identified for caspase 13 came from bovine origin, and is the likely orthologue of human caspase 4.

Caspases are a large family of proteases that cleave their substrates at C-terminal aspartic acid residues, using a catalytic cysteine in their active site. They all play critical roles in programmed cell death (apoptosis) and inflammation. In apoptosis, initiator caspases activate executioner caspases. This triggers the dismantling of the cell by cleaving key cellular proteins. This results in DNA fragmentation or membrane blebbing. This process occurs when the cytoskeleton breaks down, causing protrusions to the cellular membrane during apoptosis.caspase proteins In recent years, research has shown that caspases are also involved in non-apoptotic cellular processes like necroptosis and autophagy. Apart from their primary roles, caspases are essential in development as they remove unnecessary cells during the formation of organs and tissues. However, each protein within the Caspase family has different functions according to where they are located. The dysregulation of the caspases can cause cancer, autoimmunity, and neurodegenerative diseases. They are essential to homeostasis and maintaining healthy cells.

== History of discovery ==
Caspase-13 was initially reported to be a part of the human caspase protease family in 1998 by researchers Eric W. Hummke, Jian Ni, and Vishva M. Dixit. However, in 2000, researcher Lin X was unable to locate the Caspase-13 expression in human tissues. Following this event (2001), researchers Ulrich Koenig, Leopold Echart, and Erwin Tschachler found that several expressed sequence tags (ESTs) completely matched the published caspase-13 sequence. Further research was conducted with an analysis of reverse transcription polymerase chain reaction (RT-PCR) that revealed bovine peripheral blood mononuclear cells expressed caspase-13. This further proved that this protein is strictly found in bovines and not humans or mice.

== Structure and biochemical properties ==
Although a detailed high-resolution structural analysis has not been publicly available, caspase-13 is expected to share the characteristics of caspases. It is expected to contain a long prodomain named “caspase-recruitment domain”(CARD) and the catalytic p20 and p10 subunits by an intersubunit linker. Once activated, the proteolytic cleavage at the conserved aspartic residue leads to the removal of the prodomain and separation of the p20 (large) and p10 (small) subunits.

== Functional significance ==
In bovines, caspase-13 ensures that all cellular regulations, specifically apoptosis and inflammation, are performed. It is typically expressed in the spleen, placenta, and peripheral blood lymphocytes in bovines.

Once activated, caspase-13 can induce pyroptosis. This initiates an inflammatory form of apoptosis that causes the infected cell to swell and burst, causing a release of inflammatory signals and antimicrobial substances. This process is essential for eliminating intracellular pathogens, such as harmful bacteria or viruses

Caspase-13 can also activate cytokines by cleaving and activating the pro-inflammatory cytokines like interleukin-1β (IL-1β) and IL-18. Both of those molecules are important for coordinating the broader immune response. Additionally, these molecules recruit additional immune cells to the site of the infection and combat pathogens.

Properly functioning Caspase-13 is essential for controlling and eliminating infections in cattle. The dysfunction of this protein can lead to loss of cattle and an overall economic fall in the cattle industry. Research was conducted to provide accurate tests of Bovine viral diarrhea virus (BVDV), a leading cause of cattle death. The researchers utilized CRISPR/Cas13-based assays to detect pathogens by targeting viral RNA in the NADL strain of BVDV. The researchers were successful in predicting the viral NADL strain in infected cattle. They can continue to strengthen and improve their methods to altogether prevent pathogens from spreading to cattle and causing crashes to commercial cattle farming, like the dairy or beef industry.

== Regulation and activation ==
To activate Caspase-13, this protein is synthesized as an inactive precursor molecule or zymogen. It is then activated by cleaving into smaller and larger subunits that then form an active enzyme. This protein is highly regulated to prevent inappropriate cell death within bovines and ensure proper apoptosis.

Given that Caspase 13 is orthogonal to Caspase-4 in humans, it is plausible to suggest that it is activated through a non-canonical inflammasome pathway, primarily by binding to intracellular lipopolysaccharide (LPS). Once caspase-4 is bound to the cytosolic LPS, this promotes the formation of a Caspase-4 complex, likely through proximity-induced dimerization. The caspase-4 then cleaves itself into the active subunits due to auto-processing. As observed from Caspase-4, further research can confirm the exact regulatory mechanism of Caspase-13.

== Research significance ==
Despite its human origin being debunked, Caspase-13 remains an interest in bovine immunology, comparative studies, and in the evolutionary biology of caspases. Polyclonal antibodies against Caspase-13 have been created to aid in apoptosis research. The researchers reportedly located the protein in the cytoplasm, which shows an overexpression of Caspase-13 induced apoptosis. This suggests that apoptosis is a function of Caspase-13, like its other Caspase protein family members.
