= PMAP =

PMAP may refer to:

- The Proteolysis Map
- Pashtunkhwa Milli Awami Party
