= HS1BP3 =

Identifiers
- Aliases: HS1BP3, ETM2, HS1-BP3, HCLS1 binding protein 3
- External IDs: OMIM: 609359; MGI: 1913224; GeneCards: HS1BP3

Gene location (Human)
Chr.	Chromosome 2 (human)
Band	2p24.1	Start	20,560,448 bp
Band	2p24.1	End	20,651,130 bp

Gene location (Mouse)
Chr.	Chromosome 12 (mouse)
Band	12|12 A1.1	Start	8,363,432 bp
Band	12|12 A1.1	End	8,393,824 bp
RNA expression pattern
Bgee	Human / Mouse (ortholog); Top expressed in: popliteal artery; tibial arteries; ascending aorta; gastric mucosa; muscle layer of sigmoid colon; right adrenal gland; right adrenal cortex; left adrenal cortex; Descending thoracic aorta; monocyte / Top expressed in: gastrula; epithelium of small intestine; decidua; lumbar spinal ganglion; Ileal epithelium; granulocyte; lactiferous gland; choroid plexus of fourth ventricle; yolk sac; iris; More reference expression data
BioGPS	n/a
Gene ontology
Molecular function	phosphatidylinositol binding; protein binding
Cellular component	endoplasmic reticulum; mitochondrion
Biological process	regulation of apoptotic process; negative regulation of autophagy
Sources:Amigo / QuickGO
Orthologs
Databases	NCBI: entry; OMA: entry
Species	Human	Mouse
Entrez	64342	58240
Ensembl	ENSG00000118960	ENSMUSG00000020605
UniProt	Q53T59	Q3TC93
RefSeq (mRNA)	NM_022460; NM_106552	NM_021429
RefSeq (protein)	NP_071905	NP_067404
Location (UCSC)	Chr 2: 20.56 – 20.65 Mb	Chr 12: 8.36 – 8.39 Mb
PubMed search
- Wikidata
View/Edit Human	View/Edit Mouse

HCLS1 binding protein 3 also known as HS1BP3 is a protein which in humans is encoded by the HS1BP3 gene.

== Function ==
The protein encoded by this gene shares similarity with mouse Hs1bp3, an Hcls1-interacting protein that may be involved in lymphocyte activation.

HS1BP3 binds members of the 14-3-3 protein family, which are highly expressed in motor neurons and Purkinje cells and regulate the Ca^{2+} / calmodulin-dependent protein kinase activation of tyrosine and tryptophan hydroxylase.
