= Caspase 7 =

Protein found in humans

CASP7
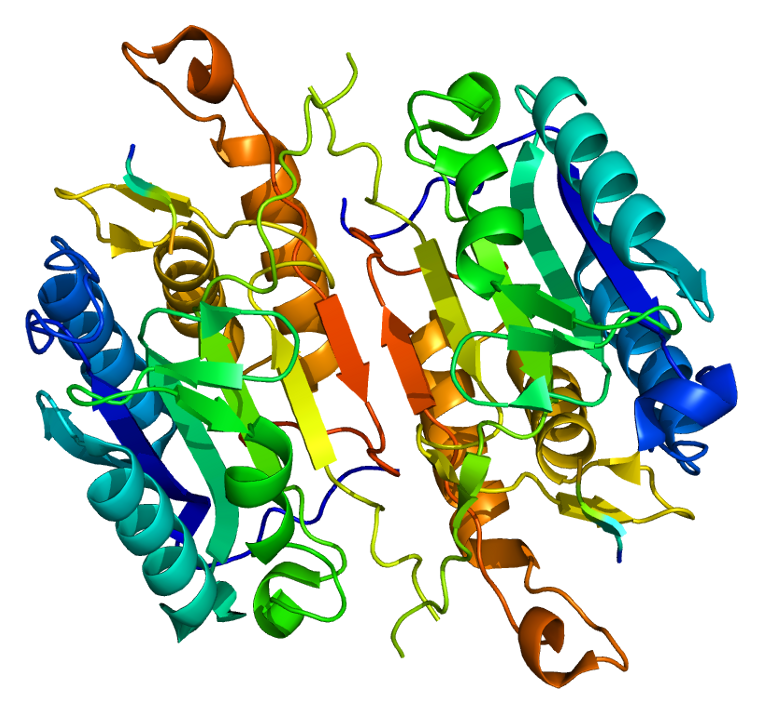

Identifiers
- Aliases: CASP7, CASP-7, CMH-1, ICE-LAP3, LICE2, MCH3, Caspase 7
- External IDs: OMIM: 601761; MGI: 109383; GeneCards: CASP7
Available structures
PDB	Ortholog search: PDBe RCSB
PDB	List of PDB id codes 1F1J, 1GQF, 1I4O, 1I51, 1K86, 1K88, 1KMC, 1SHJ, 1SHL, 2QL5, 2QL7, 2QL9, 2QLB, 2QLF, 2QLJ, 3EDR, 3H1P, 3IBC, 3IBF, 3R5K, 4FDL, 4FEA, 4HQ0, 4HQR, 4JB8, 4JJ8, 4JR1, 4JR2, 4LSZ, 4ZVR, 4ZVQ, 4ZVO, 4ZVU, 4ZVT, 4ZVS, 4ZVP, 5IC6
Enzyme activity
EC #	BRENDA	ExPASy	KEGG	MetaCyc
3.4.22.60	↗	↗	↗	↗

Gene location (Human)
Chr.	Chromosome 10 (human)
Band	10q25.3	Start	113,679,162 bp
Band	10q25.3	End	113,730,907 bp

Gene location (Mouse)
Chr.	Chromosome 19 (mouse)
Band	19 D2|19 51.84 cM	Start	56,385,561 bp
Band	19 D2|19 51.84 cM	End	56,430,776 bp
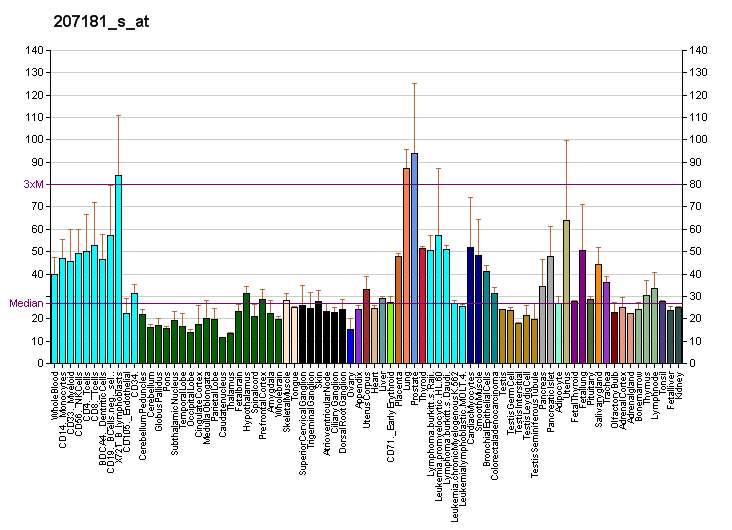
RNA expression pattern
Bgee	Human / Mouse (ortholog); Top expressed in: rectum; palpebral conjunctiva; epithelium of nasopharynx; jejunal mucosa; mucosa of transverse colon; duodenum; parotid gland; nasal epithelium; mucosa of sigmoid colon; mucosa of paranasal sinus / Top expressed in: intestinal villus; Ileal epithelium; jejunum; lens; left colon; duodenum; submandibular gland; pineal gland; conjunctival fornix; choroidal fissure; More reference expression data
BioGPS	More reference expression data
Gene ontology
Molecular function	cysteine-type peptidase activity; cysteine-type endopeptidase activity; protein binding; hydrolase activity; peptidase activity; cysteine-type endopeptidase activity involved in execution phase of apoptosis; cysteine-type endopeptidase activity involved in apoptotic process
Cellular component	cytoplasm; cytosol; nucleus; nucleoplasm
Biological process	proteolysis; cellular response to staurosporine; execution phase of apoptosis; apoptotic process
Sources:Amigo / QuickGO
Orthologs
Databases	NCBI: entry; OMA: entry
Species	Human	Mouse
Entrez	840	12369
Ensembl	ENSG00000165806	ENSMUSG00000025076
UniProt	P55210	P97864
RefSeq (mRNA)	NM_001227; NM_001267056; NM_001267057; NM_001267058; NM_033338 NM_033339; NM_033340; NM_001320911	NM_007611
RefSeq (protein)	NP_001218; NP_001253985; NP_001253986; NP_001253987; NP_001307840 NP_203124; NP_203125; NP_203126	NP_031637
Location (UCSC)	Chr 10: 113.68 – 113.73 Mb	Chr 19: 56.39 – 56.43 Mb
PubMed search
- Wikidata
View/Edit Human	View/Edit Mouse

Caspase-7, apoptosis-related cysteine peptidase, also known as CASP7, is a human protein encoded by the CASP7 gene. CASP7 orthologs have been identified in nearly all mammals for which complete genome data are available. Unique orthologs are also present in birds, lizards, lissamphibians, and teleosts.

== Function ==
Caspase-7 is a member of the caspase (cysteine aspartate protease) family of proteins, and has been shown to be an executioner protein of apoptosis. Sequential activation of caspases plays a central role in the execution-phase of cell apoptosis. Caspases exist as inactive proenzymes that undergo proteolytic processing by upstream caspases (caspase-8, -9) at conserved aspartic residues to produce two subunits, large and small, that dimerize to form the active enzyme in the form of a heterotetramer. The precursor of this caspase is cleaved by caspase 3, caspase 10, and caspase 9. It is activated upon cell death stimuli and induces apoptosis. Alternative splicing results in four transcript variants, encoding three distinct isoforms.

== Interactions ==
Caspase 7 has been shown to interact with:

- Caspase 8,
- Survivin and
- XIAP.

== See also ==
- The Proteolysis Map
- Caspase
