= Emricasan =

Chemical compound

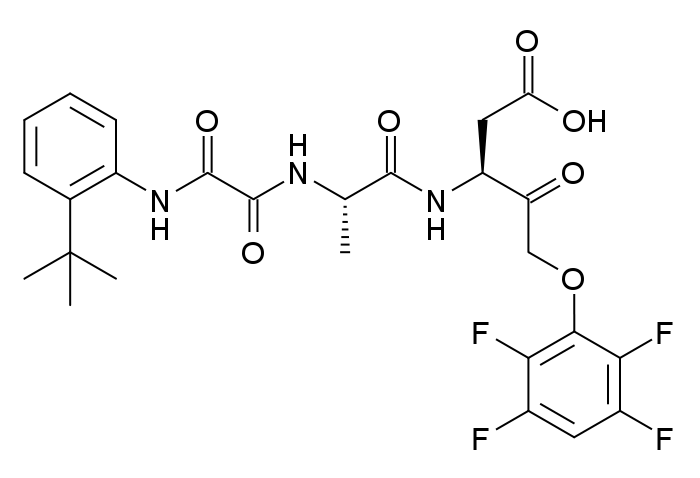

Legal status
- Legal status: US: Investigational New Drug

Identifiers
- IUPAC name: (3S)-3-{[(2S)-2-{[2-(2-tert-butylanilino)-2-oxoacetyl]amino}propanoyl]amino}-4-oxo-5-(2,3,5,6-tetrafluorophenoxy)pentanoic acid
- CAS Number: 254750-02-2
- PubChem CID: 12000240
- ChemSpider: 10172707
- UNII: P0GMS9N47Q
- KEGG: D10004
- CompTox Dashboard (EPA): DTXSID10180160

Chemical and physical data
- Formula: C_{26}H_{27}F_{4}N_{3}O_{7}
- Molar mass: 569.510 g·mol^{−1}
- 3D model (JSmol): Interactive image
- SMILES: C[C@@H](C(=O)N[C@@H](CC(=O)O)C(=O)COc1c(c(cc(c1F)F)F)F)NC(=O)C(=O)Nc2ccccc2C(C)(C)C
- InChI: InChI=1S/C26H27F4N3O7/c1-12(31-24(38)25(39)32-16-8-6-5-7-13(16)26(2,3)4)23(37)33-17(10-19(35)36)18(34)11-40-22-20(29)14(27)9-15(28)21(22)30/h5-9,12,17H,10-11H2,1-4H3,(H,31,38)(H,32,39)(H,33,37)(H,35,36)/t12-,17-/m0/s1; Key:SCVHJVCATBPIHN-SJCJKPOMSA-N

Emricasan (IDN-6556, PF-03491390) is a potential drug invented in 1998 by Idun Pharmaceuticals. The drug was acquired by Pfizer in 2005 and then sold to Conatus Pharmaceuticals in 2010. Conatus in turn licensed emricasan to Novartis in 2017 for exclusive development and commercialization.

The substance acts as a pan-caspase inhibitor and has antiapoptotic and antiinflammatory effects. It was developed for the treatment of liver disease and has been granted fast track designation by the FDA for the treatment of non-alcoholic steatohepatitis cirrhosis The substance is the first pan-caspase inhibitor to advance to broad clinical testing, and its novel mechanism of action has led to research using it for other potential applications.
