= NOL3 =

Protein-coding gene in the species Homo sapiens

Identifiers
- Aliases: NOL3, ARC, FCM, MYP, NOP, NOP30, nucleolar protein 3, MYOCL1
- External IDs: OMIM: 605235; MGI: 1925938; GeneCards: NOL3
Available structures
PDB	Ortholog search: PDBe RCSB
PDB	List of PDB id codes 4UZ0

Gene location (Human)
Chr.	Chromosome 16 (human)
Band	16q22.1	Start	67,170,154 bp
Band	16q22.1	End	67,175,735 bp

Gene location (Mouse)
Chr.	Chromosome 8 (mouse)
Band	8 D3|8 53.04 cM	Start	106,002,772 bp
Band	8 D3|8 53.04 cM	End	106,008,571 bp
RNA expression pattern
Bgee	Human / Mouse (ortholog); Top expressed in: apex of heart; gastrocnemius muscle; skin of abdomen; right adrenal gland; right adrenal cortex; skin of leg; left adrenal gland; body of pancreas; muscle of thigh; left adrenal cortex / Top expressed in: lumbar spinal ganglion; extraocular muscle; triceps brachii muscle; sternocleidomastoid muscle; temporal muscle; digastric muscle; ankle; muscle of thigh; thoracic diaphragm; right ventricle; More reference expression data
BioGPS	n/a
Gene ontology
Molecular function	death effector domain binding; calcium ion binding; death receptor binding; metal ion binding; cysteine-type endopeptidase inhibitor activity involved in apoptotic process; protein binding; RNA binding; identical protein binding; signaling receptor binding; caspase binding
Cellular component	cytosol; membrane; sarcoplasmic reticulum; sarcoplasm; nucleus; mitochondrion; nucleolus; cytoplasm
Biological process	regulation of apoptotic process; release of sequestered calcium ion into cytosol by sarcoplasmic reticulum; response to hypoxia; negative regulation of striated muscle cell apoptotic process; inhibition of cysteine-type endopeptidase activity involved in apoptotic process; negative regulation of tumor necrosis factor-mediated signaling pathway; negative regulation of muscle atrophy; negative regulation of release of cytochrome c from mitochondria; response to injury involved in regulation of muscle adaptation; negative regulation of extrinsic apoptotic signaling pathway; mRNA processing; negative regulation of apoptotic process; cardiac muscle cell apoptotic process; intrinsic apoptotic signaling pathway; negative regulation of cardiac muscle cell apoptotic process; blood vessel remodeling; response to ischemia; mRNA splice site selection; protein complex oligomerization; negative regulation of mitochondrial membrane permeability involved in apoptotic process; regulation of gene expression; negative regulation of oxidative stress-induced intrinsic apoptotic signaling pathway; negative regulation of necrotic cell death; apoptotic process; RNA splicing; negative regulation of hypoxia-induced intrinsic apoptotic signaling pathway; regulation of NIK/NF-kappaB signaling
Sources:Amigo / QuickGO
Orthologs
Databases	NCBI: entry; OMA: entry
Species	Human	Mouse
Entrez	8996	78688
Ensembl	ENSG00000140939	ENSMUSG00000014776
UniProt	O60936	Q9D1X0
RefSeq (mRNA)	NM_001185057; NM_001185058; NM_001276307; NM_001276309; NM_001276311 NM_001276312; NM_001276319; NM_003946	NM_030152
RefSeq (protein)	NP_001171986; NP_001263236; NP_001263238; NP_001263240; NP_001263241 NP_001263248; NP_003937	NP_084428
Location (UCSC)	Chr 16: 67.17 – 67.18 Mb	Chr 8: 106 – 106.01 Mb
PubMed search
- Wikidata
View/Edit Human	View/Edit Mouse

Nucleolar protein 3 is an apoptosis-repressing protein encoded by the NOL3 gene in humans.

== NOL3 gene ==
The NOL3 gene, located on chromosome 16, encodes proteins that inhibit apoptosis, most notably the apoptosis repressor with caspase recruitment domain (ARC), which is synonymous with the NOL3 protein. It also produces a nucleolar isoform of the protein.

== ARC ==
The apoptosis repressor with caspase recruitment domain (ARC) is a protein coded by Isoform 2 of the NOL3 gene due to alternative splicing. Human ARC is a cytoplasmic protein with the caspase recruitment domain (CARD). Sequence analysis revealed that ARC consists of 208 amino acids, with its N-terminal CARD fused to a C-terminal region rich in proline (P) and glutamic acid (E). Additionally, the ARC protein inhibits tumor necrosis factor α (TNFα)-mediated regulated necrosis. The ARC protein is vital for the inhibition of apoptosis, which therefore plays a role in carcinogenesis. The ARC protein is over-expressed in various cancers and in pulmonary hypertension. ARC is seen to be expressed at high levels in the heart, which is seen as a benefit to prevent apoptosis in differentiated cardiomyocytes.

=== Structure ===
ARC protein is made up of two functional groups. The CARD region of the ARC protein is homologous to the other caspase recruitment domains of caspase-2 and caspase adaptor RIP, among other proteins. The CARD region is followed by proline/glutamate tandem repeats spanning the final 110 amino acids of ARC. This decreases the pH of the protein. This region can bind to free-floating ions like calcium. CARD regions are not specific to the ARC protein and are found in other apoptosis inhibiting proteins. They all are motifs of death domain remnants and apoptotic signaling. All CARD regions recruit caspase for apoptosis. Discovered in 1997 by K. Hoffmann et al., the research is pivotal in ARC protein interactions and apoptotic inhibitions. Most CARD regions are inhibitory and the DED domain is another domain that can play the same role.

=== Function ===
The ARC protein has multiple ways of regulating or inhibiting apoptosis. ARC is expressed in cardiomyocytes, neurons, and muscle cells, but is over-expressed in malignancies. Increased ARC expression leads to a lack of cellular recognition of apoptotic signals: not only in cancer, but also in autoimmune disease, viral infections, and degenerative disorders.

ARC protein can regulate apoptosis via extrinsic or intrinsic pathways. Extrinsic pathways include caspase interaction and other death inducing signaling complexes.

=== Extrinsic inhibition ===
==== Caspase interaction ====
Although the mechanism for apoptosis inhibition by ARC is still to be further researched, speculation includes that the ARC protein targets immature caspase forms. Caspases are apoptosis effectors and regulate programmed cell-death. Cleavages occur predominately on C-terminal sides with aspartic acid (aspartate once deprotonated). Caspase activity is inhibited by the ARC protein. Specifically, the ARC protein interacts with caspase-2, caspase-8, and CED-3 but not with caspase -1, -3, or - 9. This interaction lead to inhibited cell signaling and programmed cell-death via the caspases.

==== FADD and TRADD interaction ====
ARC also inhibits programmed cell-death by affecting FADD and TRADD, which are two signaling molecules of signaling pathways that include proteins CD95/FAS and TNFR1. Expression usually results in apoptosis as the receptors activate the proteases caspase-8 along with caspase-2, but is regulated in the presence of ARC.

=== Intrinsic inhibition ===
==== BAX interaction ====
An apoptotic protein named BAX, which causes cytochrome c to release when activated is negatively affected by ARC. BAX is a mitochondrial indicator for apoptosis as oxidative stress leads to a conformational change to activated H9c2 cells. ARC and BAX interact directly and preserved mitochondrial integrity by preventing BAX activation.

==== p53 interaction ====
Transcription factor p53 is important in carcinogenesis. Normally functioning p53 protein leads to genomic stability, arrest of the cell cycle, and apoptosis. However, a study has shown that inactivation can be attributed to the direct binding of p53 to the ARC protein nucleus. This then relocates the p53 to the cytoplasm, rendering it ineffective or significantly decreasing its activity. ARC in cancer cells induces p53 to tetramerize to bind to the ARC nucleus, meaning the presence of the protein can lead to p53 inhibition. The study shows that only wild-type p53 is inhibited by ARC protein and that mutated p53 can be present in cancerous cells but is unaffected by the ARC protein.

=== Necrosis inhibition ===
Not only has ARC been found to inhibit apoptosis extrinsically and intrinsically, but also regulated form of necrosis. Necrosis, which differs from apoptosis by dysfunction of plasma membrane, cell and organelle swelling, and inflammation, can be regulated by death receptors. Tumor necrosis factor α (TNFα), which binds to tumor necrosis factor receptor 1 (TNFR1), then recruits death domains, receptor intercepting protein kinase 1 (RIP1), and other factors. This usually leads to caspase-8 activity and regular caspase apoptosis cascade. However, if caspase-8 is blocked, RIP1 and other kinases are activated, initiating necrosis. ARC is found to effect the necrosis pathway by interfering with RIP1 recruitment of TNFR1 which would thereby block necrosis. Caspase recruitment domain (CARD) is a necessary aspect to the ARC protein in regards to inhibiting necrosis. The study found that not only apoptosis inhibition but also necrosis inhibition relied on the presence of CARD.

== NOP30 ==
The nucleolar protein or NOP30 is a protein coded by Isoform 1 of the NOL3 gene due to alternative splicing. The "30" in the name comes from an expected molecular weight of 30 kDa, though the protein is actually larger than an alternative 24 kDa isoform. The increase in actual kD is speculated to be from polar charge distribution between the CARD site and the carboxylic-terminal region of NOP30. NOP30 interacts with splicing factor SRp30c which may signal NOP30 having a role in pre-mRNA processing. For now, functions of NOP30 are being explored.

=== Structure ===
NOP30 and the ARC protein share a N-terminus but their C-terminus differs. NOP30 is more basic than the ARC protein, consisting of a C-terminus filled with arginines, serines, and prolines rather than the proline and glutamic acid filled C-terminus of ARC. Additionally, NOP30 is named in the study by O. Stoss ''et al.'' (1999) because the molecular weight of the protein is 30 kDa.

=== Function ===
NOP30 is still being explored in terms of direct function. O. Stoss et al. (1999) do propose a possible novel function in terms of alternative splice site selection. Specifically, some serine/arginine (SR) proteins have a role in alternative pre-mRNA splicing. Concentration of these SR proteins can indicate splice selections on an mRNA strand. SRp30c is one of these SR proteins play a role in splice site selection. O. Stoss et al. (1999) found that the binding of NOP30 to SRp30c could lead to less SR protein concentration and thereby affecting alternative splice site selection on mRNA. NOP30 was proposed to also having an enhancing effect to SR proteins that cause alternative splicing. Further research is necessary for a more in-depth conclusion.

== Clinical significance ==
=== Carcinogenesis ===
ARC has been shown to be induced in multiple cancer types and acts as a repressor of apoptosis leading to resistance and proliferation. Paradoxically, loss of NOL3 gene also leads to hematological disruption in mice, resulting in a myeloproliferative neoplasm resembling primary myelofibrosis (PMF), and its deletion has also been detected in patient samples of PMF In PMF-like mouse models, NOL3 can play a possible tumor suppressing role in myeloid abnormalities.

ARC being related to apoptosis inhibition can lead to development of cancerous cells. Specifically, ARC carcinogenesis is induced by Ras proteins. Ras proteins are GTPases that when mutated at codons 12, 13, or 61, can have oncogenic effects. Ras can act as a transcription factor for ARC and induce NOL3 transcription. Additionally, Ras stabilizes ARC protein. Ras signaling has a possible function of decreasing activity of ubiquitin ligases specific to ARC and/or post-translational modification by Ras proteins decrease susceptibility to ubiquitination. This was specific to epithelial, breast, and colorectal cancers.

In a study by B. Carter et al. (2016), ARC played a pivotal role in acute myeloid leukemia (AML). They found that ARC mediates a signaling pathway with protein NF-κB and IL1β, a cytokine, that promotes resistance to chemotherapy in leukemic cells. In bone marrow microenvironments, AML survival is dependent on ARC in regards to creating more cells to optimize for tumor growth.

In a study done by L. Wu et al. (2024), ARC (called NOL3 protein in the study) was found to also be an affector to malignancies with the bladder. This study found that cell proliferation in bladder cancer was reduced greatly once ARC was inhibited. Patients with high amounts of ARC in tumors found within the bladder had reduced overall survival. Overexpression of NOL3 in bladder cancer tumors leads to an unusual amount of cells being in the G1 phase. Regularly, cell cycle arrest would occur leading to cell accumlation at G1 phase. However, with ARC present, the cell cycle is modulated to for increased proliferation of malignant bladder cells. Additionally, the proliferation is also attributed to the ARC protein enhancing phosphorylation of the PI3k/Akt pathway.

In terms of colorectal cancer, the ARC protein is prevalent. A study done by I. Mercier et al. (2008) found that ARC abundance was high in most human colon cancer cell lines and all primary colon cancers. Based on this study, ARC protein levels in the colon can be used a signifer or determinate of colorectal cancer or risk. ARC was abundant in 94.7% of the colorectal cancers tested in this study. In addition to colorectal cancer, this study concluded that human epithelial cancers of the ovary and cervix also had increased ARC abundance.

==== Chemo- and radiation-resistance ====
A study by I. Mercier et al. (2005) found that in human breast cancer cells, not only was ARC found in the cytosol and mitochondria but also unexpectedly found in the nuclei of both benign and malignant breast tissues. In addition to this, the study found that cytoplasmic ARC is a large contributor to human breast cancer tumors being resistant to chemo- and radiation therapy. Their methods included exposing and transfecting ARC into breast cancer cells. These breast cancer cells that now contained high levels of arc were then exposed to cancer treatments, doxorubicin or γ-radiation. They found that the highest number of surviving cells were found in the breast cancer cells transfected with ARC. Within the study, the found this evidence as an indicator for ARC being a contributor to chemo- and radiation resistance.

=== Myocardial infarction ===
T. Le et al. (2012) explored the role of ARC and the protein's possible benefit in reducing morbidity and morality in regards to myocardial infarction. T. Le et al. wanted to focus on preventing degradation of ARC in the myocardium so that during apoptosis/programmed cell-death was less likely to occur. In order to prevent degradation of ARC and maintain concentration of the apoptosis repressor, a low-dose mineralcorticoid receptor antagonist was used, specifically either spironolactone or eplerenone. Ischemia was a focus as the blockage of blood to areas within the myocardium could lead to apoptosis.

=== Hippocampal neurogenesis ===
G. Kronenberg et al. (2019) found that hippocampus neuron generation was reduced if the ARC protein was not present in mice. New generated cells in the adult hippocampus with mice are predominately eliminated by programmed cell-death. G. Kronenberg et al. (2019) found that if the ARC protein is not present to inhibit apoptotic mechanisms either intrinsically or extrinsically, the disregulation of hippocampus cell apoptosis would occur more frequently. This study further builds the ARC function for apoptosis inhibition but in regards to the brain and neurogenesis.

== Cortical myoclonus ==
There has been some research that a NOL3 gene mutation may have some connection to familial cortical myoclonus. A study done in 2012 by J. Russell et al. observed 11 members of a Canadian Mennonite family suffering myoclonus. They observed an autosomal dominant inherited, single cosegregating, novel, non-synonymous mutation on NOL3. However, a study published in 2014 by A. Macerollo had screened 107 patients with myoclonic jerks and only a single subject had a single nucleotide mutation in NOL3. Further conclusive evidence is still required for a full causal or correlative conclusion between NOL3 and familial cortical myoclonus.
