= Jeffrey W. Smith =

Jeffrey W. Smith is Director, Program for Excellence in Nanotechnology, Center on Proteolytic Pathways, Tumor Microenvironment at the Burnham Institute. Smith earned his Ph.D. in biological sciences at University of California, Irvine in 1987. Following postdoctoral training at The Scripps Research Institute, he was appointed to their staff in 1991. Smith was recruited to The Burnham Institute in 1995.

== See also ==
- Nanotechnology
- The Proteolysis Map
