= IFT57 =

Protein-coding gene in the species Homo sapiens

Identifiers
- Aliases: IFT57, ESRRBL1, HIPPI, MHS4R2, intraflagellar transport 57, OFD18
- External IDs: OMIM: 606621; MGI: 1921166; GeneCards: IFT57

Gene location (Human)
Chr.	Chromosome 3 (human)
Band	3q13.12-q13.13	Start	108,160,812 bp
Band	3q13.12-q13.13	End	108,222,435 bp

Gene location (Mouse)
Chr.	Chromosome 16 (mouse)
Band	16|16 B5	Start	49,519,596 bp
Band	16|16 B5	End	49,585,489 bp
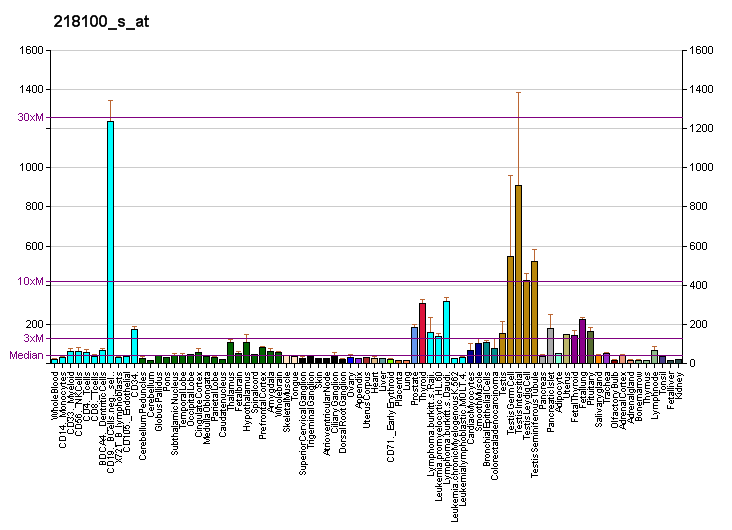
RNA expression pattern
Bgee	Human / Mouse (ortholog); Top expressed in: bronchial epithelial cell; sperm; caput epididymis; left testis; mucosa of paranasal sinus; right testis; olfactory zone of nasal mucosa; epithelium of nasopharynx; corpus epididymis; right uterine tube / Top expressed in: Epithelium of choroid plexus; fossa; islet of Langerhans; seminiferous tubule; condyle; ciliary body; barrel cortex; vestibular sensory epithelium; lateral geniculate nucleus; medial geniculate nucleus; More reference expression data
BioGPS	More reference expression data
Gene ontology
Molecular function	DNA binding; protein binding
Cellular component	intraciliary transport particle B; cytoplasm; ciliary basal body; centrosome; Golgi apparatus; cell projection; photoreceptor connecting cilium; dendrite terminus; ciliary tip; axoneme; cytoskeleton; cilium
Biological process	regulation of apoptotic process; regulation of transcription, DNA-templated; intraciliary transport; transcription, DNA-templated; heart looping; neural tube closure; negative regulation of epithelial cell proliferation; smoothened signaling pathway; left/right pattern formation; activation of cysteine-type endopeptidase activity involved in apoptotic process; apoptotic process; intraciliary transport involved in cilium assembly; motile cilium assembly; non-motile cilium assembly; cilium assembly
Sources:Amigo / QuickGO
Orthologs
Databases	NCBI: entry; OMA: entry
Species	Human	Mouse
Entrez	55081	73916
Ensembl	ENSG00000114446	ENSMUSG00000032965
UniProt	Q9NWB7	Q8BXG3
RefSeq (mRNA)	NM_018010	NM_028680
RefSeq (protein)	NP_060480	NP_082956
Location (UCSC)	Chr 3: 108.16 – 108.22 Mb	Chr 16: 49.52 – 49.59 Mb
PubMed search
- Wikidata
View/Edit Human	View/Edit Mouse

Intraflagellar transport protein 57 homolog is a protein that in humans is encoded by the IFT57 gene.

== Interactions ==
IFT57 has been shown to interact with Caspase 8.
