= Caspase 12 =

Protein found in humans

CASP12

Identifiers
- Aliases: CASP12, CASP-12, CASP12P1, caspase 12 (gene/pseudogene), caspase 12, Caspase-12, Caspase_12, IPR035713
- External IDs: OMIM: 608633; MGI: 1312922; GeneCards: CASP12

Gene location (Human)
Chr.	Chromosome 11 (human)
Band	11q22.3	Start	104,885,718 bp
Band	11q22.3	End	104,898,670 bp

Gene location (Mouse)
Chr.	Chromosome 9 (mouse)
Band	9 A1|9 2.46 cM	Start	5,345,430 bp
Band	9 A1|9 2.46 cM	End	5,373,032 bp
RNA expression pattern
Bgee	Human / Mouse (ortholog); Top expressed in: testicle; right lung; left ovary; gastric mucosa; ascending aorta; Descending thoracic aorta; popliteal artery; tibial arteries; left coronary artery; right ovary / Top expressed in: temporal muscle; tunica media of zone of aorta; sternocleidomastoid muscle; lumbar spinal ganglion; triceps brachii muscle; intercostal muscle; uterus; carotid body; ascending aorta; semi-lunar valve; More reference expression data
BioGPS	n/a
Gene ontology
Molecular function	cysteine-type endopeptidase activity involved in apoptotic process; cysteine-type peptidase activity; cysteine-type endopeptidase activity; cysteine-type endopeptidase activity involved in apoptotic signaling pathway
Cellular component	NLRP3 inflammasome complex; AIM2 inflammasome complex; IPAF inflammasome complex; endoplasmic reticulum; cytoplasm
Biological process	regulation of apoptotic process; regulation of inflammatory response; proteolysis; execution phase of apoptosis; apoptotic process; activation of cysteine-type endopeptidase activity involved in apoptotic process; apoptotic signaling pathway
Sources:Amigo / QuickGO
Orthologs
Databases	NCBI: entry; OMA: entry
Species	Human	Mouse
Entrez	100506742	12364
Ensembl	ENSG00000204403	ENSMUSG00000025887
UniProt	Q6UXS9	O08736
RefSeq (mRNA)	NM_001191016	NM_009808
RefSeq (protein)	NP_001177945	NP_033938
Location (UCSC)	Chr 11: 104.89 – 104.9 Mb	Chr 9: 5.35 – 5.37 Mb
PubMed search
- Wikidata
View/Edit Human	View/Edit Mouse

Caspase 12 is a protein that in humans is encoded by the CASP12 gene. The protein belongs to a family of enzymes called caspases which cleave their substrates at C-terminal aspartic acid residues. It is closely related to caspase 1 and other members of the caspase family, known as inflammatory caspases, which process and activate inflammatory cytokines such as interleukin 1 and interleukin 18.

== Gene ==
It is found on chromosome 11 in humans in a locus with other inflammatory caspases. CASP12 orthologs have been identified in numerous mammals for which complete genome data are available.

== Clinical significance ==
The CASP12 gene is subject to polymorphism, which can generate a full-length caspase protein (Csp12L) or an inactive truncated form (Csp12S). The functional form appears to be confined to people of African descent and is linked with susceptibility to sepsis; people carrying the functional gene have decreased responses to bacterial molecules such as lipopolysaccharide (LPS).

A study in May 2009 by McGill University Health Centre has suggested that estrogen may serve to block the production of caspase-12, resulting in a stronger inflammatory reaction to bacterial pathogens. The trials were carried out on laboratory mice which had been implanted with the human caspase-12 gene.

The inactive truncated form (Csp12S) of the CASP12 gene was spread and nearly fixed in non-African populations due to positive selection beginning perhaps 60–100 thousand years ago. Its selective advantage is thought to be sepsis resistance in populations that experienced more infectious diseases as population sizes and densities increased.
