= Cellular anastasis =

Process of reversing apoptosis

Anastasis is a cellular phenomenon characterized by recovery of cells threatened by cell death; it essentially reverses the process of programmed cell death, or apoptosis. Contrary to the prior assumption that apoptosis is irreversible, some cells have been discovered to resist the stimuli that trigger apoptosis. Some of these cells can survive even following the activation of executioner caspases, forming the basis of anastasis. The initial phase of recovery begins when transcription is initiated and the cell recovers from previous stressors. Finally, the cell's cytoskeleton undergoes reorganization, reinforcing its structure and encouraging migration. The relatively recent discovery of anastasis is a key factor in the survival of cancer cells exposed to chemotherapy and changed the way scientists approach the topic of cell death. Anastasis is possible even during advanced stages of cell death, leading researchers to believe that further research on the topic can have therapeutic and pathological implications. Further exploration of the phenomenon could potentially bring forth information including treatment for neurodegenerative diseases and anti-aging therapy.

== History ==
=== Apoptosis ===
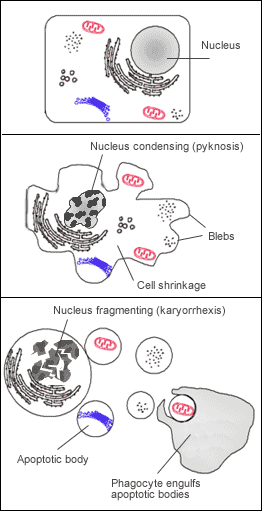
Labelled diagram of a cell undergoing apoptosis.

Apoptosis, or programmed cell death, was discovered in 1842 by Carl Vogt and was initially believed to be irreversible. Once a cell exhibited signs of apoptosis, the cell was doomed. Apoptosis is triggered by external or internal signals, such as developmental cues or cellular damage, which activate cellular pathways leading to apoptosis. Cells at risk of cell death display shrinkage and membrane blebbing. Once the pathway to cellular death is initiated, an enzyme known as caspase, a proteolytic cysteine, is activated. Caspase breaks down proteins and DNA in the cells, preparing the cell for removal by phagocytes. Should apoptosis be restricted or prevented, uncontrolled cell division and tumor growth may occur. Apoptosis has a significant role in maintaining tissue homeostasis by eliminating damaged cells and preventing tumor formation. Cells that are no longer needed or damaged are targeted for apoptosis, aiding in the regulation of normal conditions and body functioning.

=== Anastasis ===
Apoptosis was once considered irreversible and unavoidable before the recent discovery of the process of anastasis. It is a rapid process with many initiating factors that were once believed to be permanent. Anastasis, meaning rising to life, was a term coined by siblings Ho Man Tang and Ho Lam Tang following their discovery at the University of Hong Kong in 2007. The Tang siblings executed their experiment by exposing breast cancer cells to various toxic chemicals and waiting for signs of apoptosis. After the cells displayed these characteristics, they then washed the cells with fresh medium and allowed them to incubate. The cancer cells were induced into apoptosis by treating them with ethanol, and the results showed that survival of these cells was possible. Many cells in the original study survived apoptosis and appeared normal once again following the washing of the cells by fresh medium. Tang's results were not initially well received due to the popular opinion at the time that apoptosis was irreversible. However, their research eventually became more accepted and challenged the traditional understanding of apoptosis as an irreversible process. The discovery of anastasis suggested that cells have the potential to reverse the process of cell death under certain circumstances.

=== Etymology ===
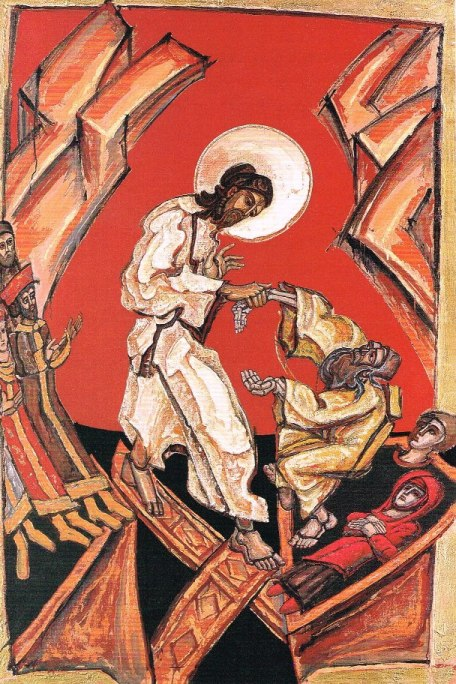
Alek Rapoport, Anastasis I, 1996

The word Anastasis comes from the Greek word for resurrection, ανάσταση. The prefix ana- means "upward" or "again", and the root sta- means "to stand", forming a combined meaning of "standing again" or "resurrection". In Christianity, the term anastasis refers to the resurrection of Jesus Christ. The term is used to describe the notion of rising or standing again after a period of death or dormancy. The use of the word anastasis began increasing steadily following the Tang siblings' discovery in 2007.

== Process ==
Anastasis begins in response to stimuli such as DNA damage, chemical stress, and other indicators of approaching cellular death. During early stages of apoptosis, mechanisms allow the cell to evade destruction and halt the process of cell death. Once the apoptotic process is halted, the cell undergoes recovery and repair. The process of transcription resumes, allowing the cell to synthesize vital proteins. Normal cellular morphology and function are restored, and the cell is no longer in danger of cell death. The recovery of cells can limit the damage done to tissue by injury or infection.

== Clinical applications ==
=== Cancer treatment ===
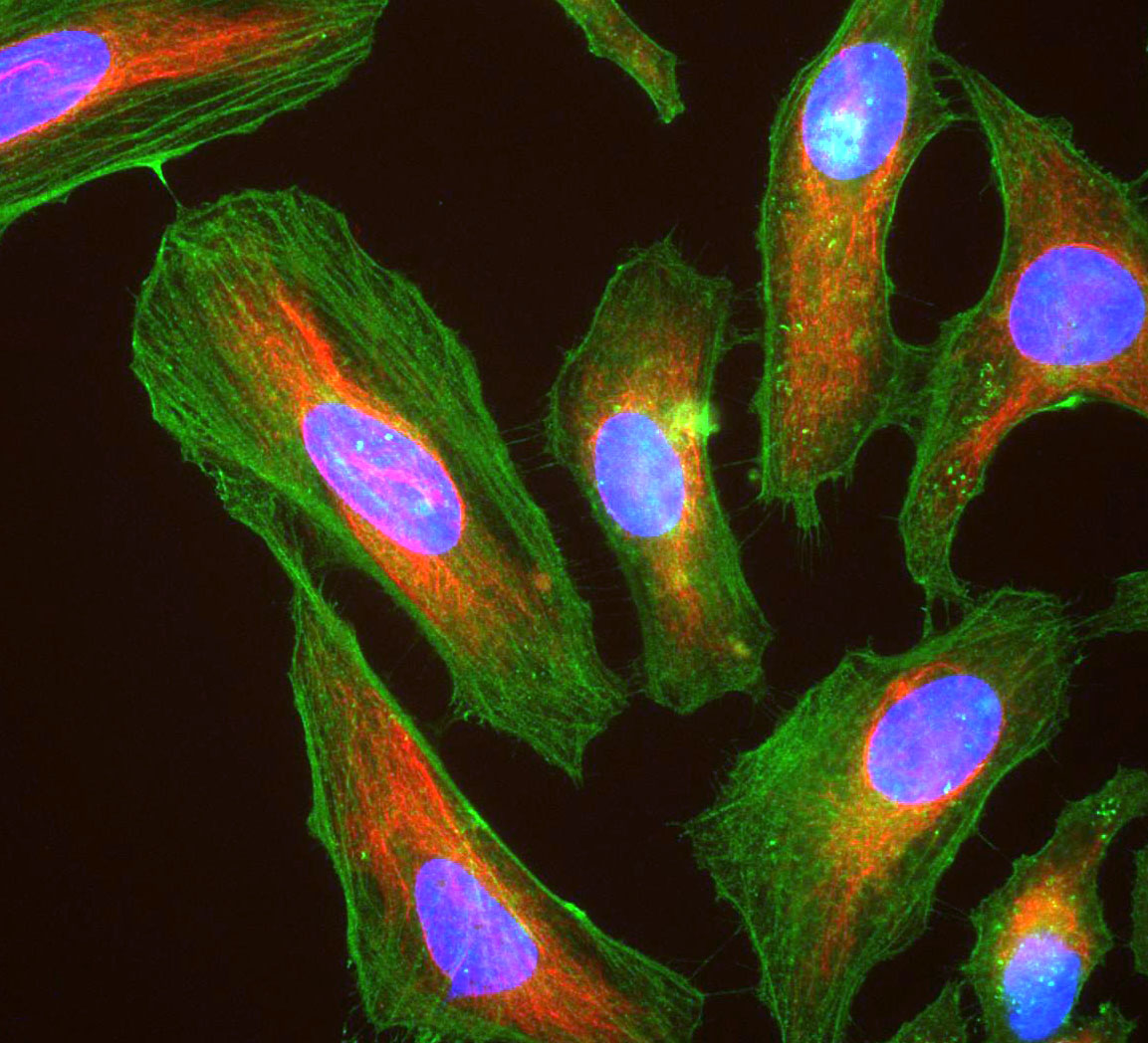
HeLa cervical cancer cells

Some cancer cells can undergo the process of anastasis after they are exposed to chemotherapy. Anastasis can help cancer cells by enhancing their migration, metastasis, and resistance to chemotherapy. The process of anastasis can be one explanation for the survival of cancer cells after they are treated with cytotoxic drugs; apoptotic cells are able to recover via anastasis following the elimination of such compounds. Similarly to the University of Hong Kong study on breast cancer cells, a study of HeLa cancer cells showed that the cells were able to recover from the presence of caspase and ethanol after being washed with fresh medium. Another study suggested that anastasis in normal cells can even induce carcinomatous results. Due to these effects, tumors can progress and grow in size thanks to anastasis. By understanding this phenomenon, cancer treatments may be improved.
