= Caspase =

Caspase domain
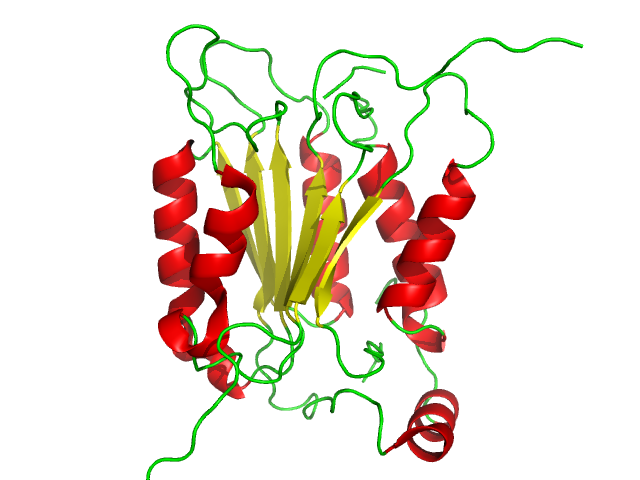
- Structure of caspase-1 (CASP1), originally called interleukin-1 beta-converting enzyme (ICE), the first human caspase to be identified.

Identifiers
- Symbol: Peptidase_C14
- Pfam: PF00656
- Pfam clan: CL0093
- InterPro: IPR002398
- PROSITE: PS50208
- MEROPS: C14
- SCOP2: 1ice / SCOPe / SUPFAM
Available protein structures:
- PDB: IPR002398 PF00656 (ECOD; PDBsum)
- AlphaFold: IPR002398; PF00656

Caspases (cysteine-aspartic proteases, cysteine aspartases or cysteine-dependent aspartate-directed proteases) are a family of protease enzymes playing essential roles in programmed cell death. They are named caspases due to their specific cysteine protease activity – a cysteine in its active site nucleophilically attacks and cleaves a target protein only after an aspartic acid residue. As of 2009, there are 12 confirmed caspases in humans (Note: Functional CASP12 is only expressed in some individuals of African descent, while individuals of Asian or Caucasian descent express only a non-functional truncated form.) and 10 in mice, carrying out a variety of cellular functions.

The role of these enzymes in programmed cell death was first identified in 1993, with their functions in apoptosis well characterised. This is a form of programmed cell death, occurring widely during development, and throughout life to maintain cell homeostasis. Activation of caspases ensures that the cellular components are degraded in a controlled manner, carrying out cell death with minimal effect on surrounding tissues.

Caspases have other identified roles in programmed cell death such as pyroptosis, necroptosis and PANoptosis. These forms of cell death are important for protecting an organism from stress signals and pathogenic attack. Caspases also have a role in inflammation, whereby it directly processes pro-inflammatory cytokines such as pro-IL1β. These are signalling molecules that allow recruitment of immune cells to an infected cell or tissue. There are other identified roles of caspases such as cell proliferation, tumor suppression, cell differentiation, neural development and axon guidance and ageing.

Caspase deficiency has been identified as a cause of tumor development. Tumor growth can occur by a combination of factors, including a mutation in a cell cycle gene which removes the restraints on cell growth, combined with mutations in apoptotic proteins such as caspases that would respond by inducing cell death in abnormally growing cells. Conversely, over-activation of some caspases such as caspase-3 can lead to excessive programmed cell death. This is seen in several neurodegenerative diseases where neural cells are lost, such as Alzheimer's disease. Caspases involved with processing inflammatory signals are also implicated in disease. Insufficient activation of these caspases can increase an organism's susceptibility to infection, as an appropriate immune response may not be activated. The integral role caspases play in cell death and disease has led to research on using caspases as a drug target. For example, inflammatory caspase-1 has been implicated in causing autoimmune diseases; drugs blocking the activation of Caspase-1 have been used to improve the health of patients. Additionally, scientists have used caspases as cancer therapy to kill unwanted cells in tumors.

== Functional classification of caspases ==
Most caspases play a role in programmed cell death. These are summarized in the table below. The enzymes are sub classified into three types: Initiator, Executioner and Inflammatory.

Programmed Cell Death	Type of Caspase	Enzyme	Organism
Apoptosis	Initiator	Caspase 2	human and mouse
Apoptosis	Initiator	Caspase 8	human and mouse
Apoptosis	Initiator	Caspase 9	human and mouse
Apoptosis	Initiator	Caspase 10	human only
Apoptosis	Executioner	Caspase 3	human and mouse
Apoptosis	Executioner	Caspase 6	human and mouse
Apoptosis	Executioner	Caspase 7	human and mouse
Pyroptosis	Inflammatory	Caspase 1	human and mouse
Pyroptosis	Inflammatory	Caspase 4	human (Note: CASP4 and CASP5 are considered to be the human orthologues of CASP11, which was found in mice and rats but not in humans.)
Pyroptosis	Inflammatory	Caspase 5	human
Pyroptosis	Inflammatory	Caspase 11	mouse
Pyroptosis	Inflammatory	Caspase 12	mouse and some humans
Pyroptosis	Inflammatory	Caspase 13	cattle only
Other roles	Other	Caspase 14	human and mouse

Note that in addition to apoptosis, caspase-8 is also required for the inhibition of another form of programmed cell death called necroptosis. Caspase-14 plays a role in epithelial cell keratinocyte differentiation and can form an epidermal barrier that protects against dehydration and UVB radiation.

== Activation of caspases ==
Caspases are synthesised as inactive zymogens (pro-caspases) that are only activated following an appropriate stimulus. This post-translational level of control allows rapid and tight regulation of the enzyme.

Activation involves dimerization and often oligomerisation of pro-caspases, followed by cleavage into a small subunit and large subunit. The large and small subunit associate with each other to form an active heterodimer caspase. The active enzyme often exists as a heterotetramer in the biological environment, where a pro-caspase dimer is cleaved together to form a heterotetramer.

=== Dimerisation ===
The activation of initiator caspases and inflammatory caspases is initiated by dimerisation, which is facilitated by binding to adaptor proteins via protein–protein interaction motifs that are collectively referred to as death folds. The death folds are located in a structural domain of the caspases known as the pro-domain, which is larger in those caspases that contain death folds than in those that do not. The pro-domain of the intrinsic initiator caspases and the inflammatory caspases contains a single death fold known as caspase recruitment domain (CARD), while the pro-domain of the extrinsic initiator caspases contains two death folds known as death effector domains (DED).

Multiprotein complexes often form during caspase activation. Some activating multiprotein complexes includes:

- The death-inducing signaling complex (DISC) during extrinsic apoptosis
- The apoptosome during intrinsic apoptosis
- The inflammasome during pyroptosis

=== Cleavage ===
Once appropriately dimerised, the Caspases cleave at inter domain linker regions, forming a large and small subunit. This cleavage allows the active-site loops to take up a conformation favourable for enzymatic activity.

Cleavage of Initiator and Executioner caspases occur by different methods outlined in the table below.

- Initiator caspases auto-proteolytically cleave whereas Executioner caspases are cleaved by initiator caspases. This hierarchy allows an amplifying chain reaction or cascade for degrading cellular components, during controlled cell death.

Initiator Caspase Caspase-8	Inititator Pro-caspases have a prodomain that allows recruitment of other pro-caspases, which subsequently dimerise. Both pro-caspase molecules undergo cleavage by autocatalysis. This leads to removal of the prodomain and cleavage of the linker region between the large and small subunit. A heterotetramer is formed	PDB image of caspase 8 (3KJQ) in 'biological assembly'. Two shades of blue used to represent two small sunits, while two shades of purple represent two large subunits
Executioner Caspase Caspase-3	Executioner caspases constitutively exist as homodimers. The red cuts represent regions where initiator caspases cleave the executioner caspases. The resulting small and large subunit of each Caspase-3 will associate, resulting in a heterotetramer.	PDB image of Caspase 3 (4QTX) in 'biological assembly'. Two shades of blue used to represent two small sunits, while two shades of purple represent two large subunits

== Some roles of caspases ==
=== Apoptosis ===
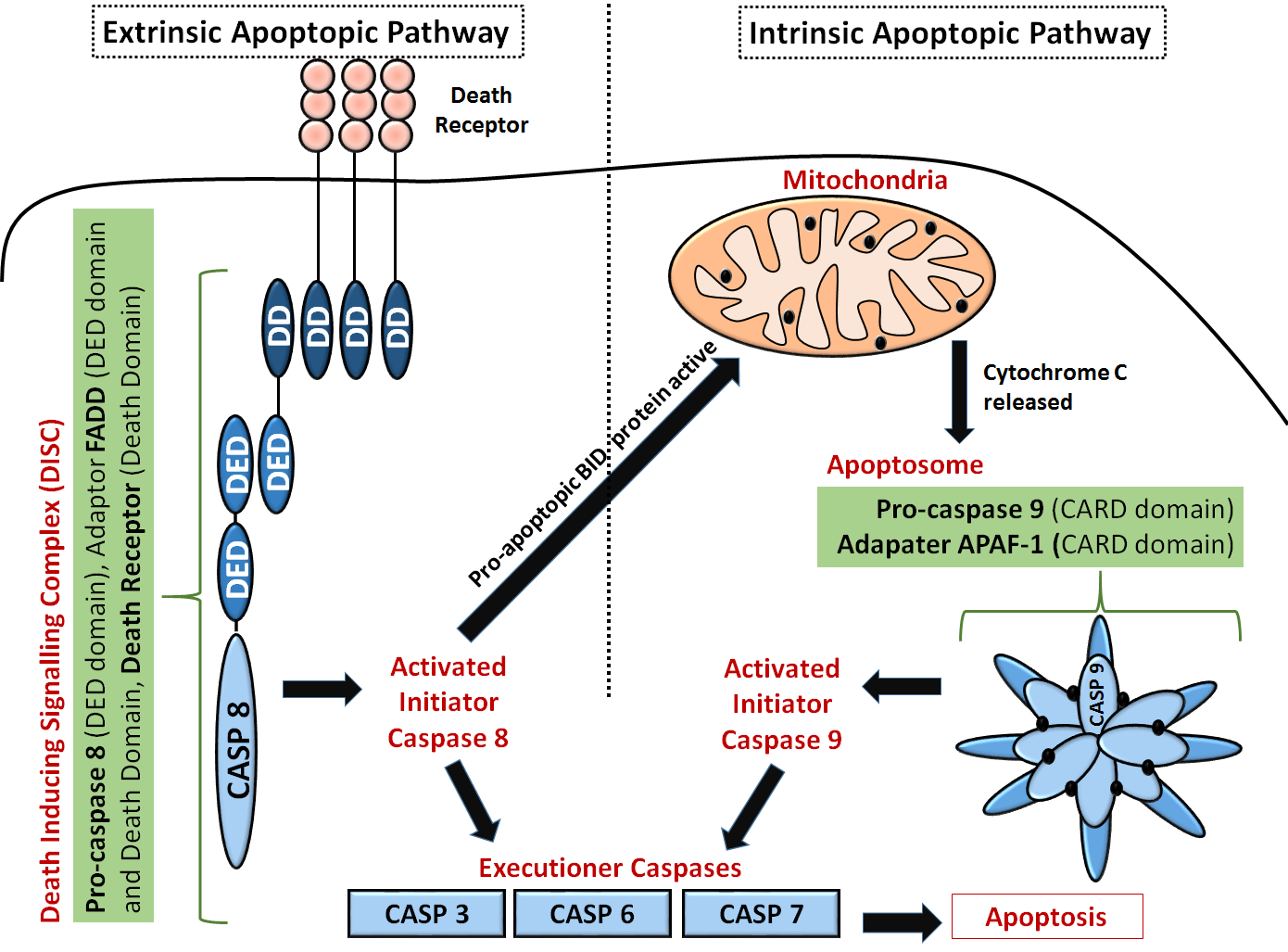
Initiator caspases are activated by intrinsic and extrinsic apoptotic pathways. This leads to the activation of other caspases including executioner caspases that carry out apoptosis by cleaving cellular components.

Apoptosis is a form of programmed cell death where the cell undergoes morphological changes, to minimize its effect on surrounding cells to avoid inducing an immune response. The cell shrinks and condenses - the cytoskeleton will collapse, and the nuclear envelope disassembles the DNA fragments up. This results in the cell forming self-enclosed bodies called 'blebs', to avoid release of cellular components into the extracellular medium. Additionally, the cell membrane phospholipid content is altered, which makes the dying cell more susceptible to phagocytic attack and removal.

Apoptotic caspases are subcategorised as:

1. Initiator Caspases (Caspase 2, Caspase 8, Caspase 9, Caspase 10)
2. Executioner Caspases (Caspase 3, Caspase 6 and Caspase 7)

Once initiator caspases are activated, they produce a chain reaction, activating several other executioner caspases. Executioner caspases degrade over 600 cellular components in order to induce the morphological changes for apoptosis.

Examples of caspase cascade during apoptosis:

1. Intrinsic apoptotic pathway: During times of cellular stress, mitochondrial cytochrome c is released into the cytosol. This molecule binds an adaptor protein (APAF-1), which recruits initiator Caspase-9 (via CARD-CARD interactions). This leads to the formation of a Caspase activating multiprotein complex called the Apoptosome. Once activated, initiator caspases such as Caspase 9 will cleave and activate other executioner caspases. This leads to degradation of cellular components for apoptosis.
2. Extrinsic apoptotic pathway: The caspase cascade is also activated by extracellular ligands, via cell surface Death Receptors. This is done by the formation of a multiprotein Death Inducing Signalling Complex (DISC) that recruits and activates a pro-caspase. For example, the Fas Ligand binds the FasR receptor at the receptor's extracellular surface; this activates the death domains at the cytoplasmic tail of the receptor. The adaptor protein FADD will recruit (by a Death domain-Death domain interaction) pro-Caspase 8 via the DED domain. This FasR, FADD and pro-Caspase 8 form the Death Inducing Signalling Complex (DISC) where Caspase-8 is activated. This could lead to either downstream activation of the intrinsic pathway by inducing mitochondrial stress, or direct activation of Executioner Caspases (Caspase 3, Caspase 6 and Caspase 7) to degrade cellular components as shown in the adjacent diagram.

=== Pyroptosis ===
Pyroptosis is a form of programmed cell death that inherently induces an immune response. It is morphologically distinct from other types of cell death – cells swell up, rupture and release pro-inflammatory cellular contents. This is done in response to a range of stimuli including microbial infections as well as heart attacks (myocardial infarctions). Caspase-1, Caspase-4 and Caspase-5 in humans, and Caspase-1 and Caspase-11 in mice play important roles in inducing cell death by pyroptosis. This limits the life and proliferation time of intracellular and extracellular pathogens.

==== Pyroptosis by caspase-1 ====
Caspase-1 activation is mediated by a repertoire of proteins, allowing detection of a range of pathogenic ligands. Some mediators of Caspase-1 activation are: NOD-like Leucine Rich Repeats (NLRs), AIM2-Like Receptors (ALRs), Pyrin and IFI16.

These proteins allow caspase-1 activation by forming a multiprotein activating complex called Inflammasomes. For example, a NOD Like Leucine Rich Repeat NLRP3 will sense an efflux of potassium ions from the cell. This cellular ion imbalance leads to oligomerisation of NLRP3 molecules to form a multiprotein complex called the NLRP3 inflammasome. The pro-caspase-1 is brought into close proximity with other pro-caspase molecule in order to dimerise and undergo auto-proteolytic cleavage.

Some pathogenic signals that lead to Pyroptosis by Caspase-1 are listed below:

- DNA in the host cytosol binds to AIM2-Like Receptors inducing Pyroptosis
- Type III secretion system apparatus from bacteria bind NOD Like Leucine Rich Repeats receptors called NAIP's (1 in humans and 4 in mice)

Pyroptosis by Caspase-4 and Caspase-5 in humans and Caspase-11 in mice

These caspases have the ability to induce direct pyroptosis when lipopolysaccharide (LPS) molecules (found in the cell wall of gram negative bacteria) are found in the cytoplasm of the host cell. For example, Caspase 4 acts as a receptor and is proteolytically activated, without the need of an inflammasome complex or Caspase-1 activation.

A crucial downstream substrate for pyroptotic caspases is Gasdermin D (GSDMD)

=== Role in inflammation ===
Inflammation is a protective attempt by an organism to restore a homeostatic state, following disruption from harmful stimulus, such as tissue damage or bacterial infection.

Caspase-1, Caspase-4, Caspase-5 and Caspase-11 are considered 'Inflammatory Caspases'.

- Caspase-1 is key in activating pro-inflammatory cytokines; these act as signals to immune cells and make the environment favourable for immune cell recruitment to the site of damage. Caspase-1 therefore plays a fundamental role in the innate immune system. The enzyme is responsible for processing cytokines such as pro-ILβ and pro-IL18, as well as secreting them.
- Caspase-4 and -5 in humans, and Caspase-11 in mice have a unique role as a receptor, whereby it binds to LPS, a molecule abundant in gram negative bacteria. This can lead to the processing and secretion of IL-1β and IL-18 cytokines by activating Caspase-1; this downstream effect is the same as described above. It also leads to the secretion of another inflammatory cytokine that is not processed. This is called pro-IL1α. There is also evidence of an inflammatory caspase, caspase-11 aiding cytokine secretion; this is done by inactivating a membrane channel that blocks IL-1β secretion
- Caspases can also induce an inflammatory response on a transcriptional level. There is evidence where it promotes transcription of nuclear factor-κB (NF-κB), a transcription factor that assists in transcribing inflammatory cytokines such as IFNs, TNF, IL-6 and IL-8. For example, Caspase-1 activates Caspase-7, which in turn cleaves the poly (ADP) ribose – this activates transcription of NF-κB controlled genes.

== Discovery of caspases ==
H. Robert Horvitz initially established the importance of caspases in apoptosis and found that the ced-3 gene is required for the cell death that took place during the development of the nematode C. elegans. Horvitz and his colleague Junying Yuan found in 1993 that the protein encoded by the ced-3 gene is cysteine protease with similar properties to the mammalian interleukin-1-beta converting enzyme (ICE) (now known as caspase 1). At the time, ICE was the only known caspase. Other mammalian caspases were subsequently identified, in addition to caspases in organisms such as fruit fly Drosophila melanogaster.

Researchers decided upon the nomenclature of the caspase in 1996. In many instances, a particular caspase had been identified simultaneously by more than one laboratory; each would then give the protein a different name. For example, caspase 3 was variously known as CPP32, apopain and Yama. Caspases, therefore, were numbered in the order in which they were identified. ICE was, therefore, renamed as caspase 1. ICE was the first mammalian caspase to be characterised because of its similarity to the nematode death gene ced-3, but it appears that the principal role of this enzyme is to mediate inflammation rather than cell death.

== Evolution ==
In animals apoptosis is induced by caspases and in fungi and plants, apoptosis is induced by arginine and lysine-specific caspase-like proteases called metacaspases. Homology searches revealed a close homology between caspases and the caspase-like proteins of Reticulomyxa (a unicellular organism). The phylogenetic study indicates that divergence of caspase and metacaspase sequences occurred before the divergence of eukaryotes.

== Detection ==
Detection of executioner caspase activity frequently utilizes the tetrapeptide DEVD, which corresponds to the preferred cleavage motif for caspase‑3 and caspase‑7. DEVD is a short peptide sequence made up of four amino acids: D – Aspartic acid (Asp); E – Glutamic acid (Glu); V – Valine (Val); D – Aspartic acid (Asp).

In fluorometric assays, substrates such as DEVD‑AMC or DEVD‑AFC release a fluorescent moiety upon caspase-mediated cleavage; the fluorescence intensity serves as a direct readout of enzymatic activity. Chromogenic alternatives like DEVD‑pNA allow similar spectrophotometric measurement.

More sophisticated approaches employ genetically encoded biosensors containing a DEVD linker, which restore fluorescence only after cleavage by active caspases, enabling real-time, live-cell monitoring of apoptosis. A dual-fluorescent reporter system combining a DEVD-containing ZipGFP biosensor with constitutive mCherry expression has been developed. This platform permits dynamic tracking of caspase‑3/‑7 activation and apoptosis in both 2D and 3D culture systems, including spheroids and organoids, and can be integrated with calreticulin exposure assays to differentiate immunogenic forms of cell death.

== See also ==
- Apoptosis
- Apoptosome
- Bcl-2
- Emricasan
- Metacaspase
- Paracaspase
- Pyroptosis
- The Proteolysis Map
- Programmed cell death
- Cellular anastasis
