= IRAK3 =

Identifiers
- Aliases: IRAK3, ASRT5, IRAKM, interleukin 1 receptor associated kinase 3
- External IDs: OMIM: 604459; MGI: 1921164; GeneCards: IRAK3

Gene location (Human)
Chr.	Chromosome 12 (human)
Band	12q14.3	Start	66,189,195 bp
Band	12q14.3	End	66,254,622 bp

Gene location (Mouse)
Chr.	Chromosome 10 (mouse)
Band	10|10 D2	Start	119,977,553 bp
Band	10|10 D2	End	120,038,035 bp
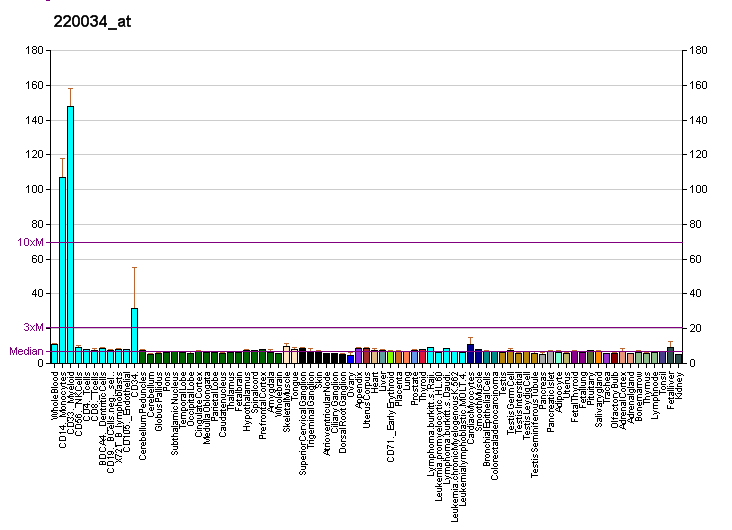
RNA expression pattern
Bgee	Human / Mouse (ortholog); Top expressed in: monocyte; bone marrow; parietal pleura; blood; right lung; bone marrow cell; palpebral conjunctiva; spleen; lower lobe of lung; trabecular bone / Top expressed in: granulocyte; gastrula; spermatocyte; seminiferous tubule; spermatid; bone marrow; ankle; sciatic nerve; lip; blood; More reference expression data
BioGPS	More reference expression data
Gene ontology
Molecular function	nucleotide binding; protein kinase activity; transferase activity; magnesium ion binding; protein serine/threonine kinase activity; kinase activity; protein homodimerization activity; protein heterodimerization activity; ATP binding; protein binding
Cellular component	cytoplasm; nucleus; plasma membrane
Biological process	response to lipopolysaccharide; negative regulation of innate immune response; signal transduction; negative regulation of macrophage cytokine production; protein autophosphorylation; negative regulation of protein-containing complex disassembly; response to interleukin-1; response to exogenous dsRNA; protein phosphorylation; negative regulation of toll-like receptor signaling pathway; cytokine-mediated signaling pathway; response to virus; response to peptidoglycan; negative regulation of cytokine-mediated signaling pathway; regulation of protein-containing complex disassembly; positive regulation of macrophage tolerance induction; negative regulation of NF-kappaB transcription factor activity; phosphorylation; negative regulation of protein catabolic process; negative regulation of interleukin-6 production; interleukin-1-mediated signaling pathway; positive regulation of NF-kappaB transcription factor activity; negative regulation of MAP kinase activity; negative regulation of tumor necrosis factor production; negative regulation of interleukin-12 production; MyD88-dependent toll-like receptor signaling pathway; intracellular signal transduction
Sources:Amigo / QuickGO
Orthologs
Databases	NCBI: entry; OMA: entry
Species	Human	Mouse
Entrez	11213	73914
Ensembl	ENSG00000090376	ENSMUSG00000020227
UniProt	Q9Y616	Q8K4B2
RefSeq (mRNA)	NM_007199; NM_001142523	NM_028679; NM_001359184
RefSeq (protein)	NP_001135995; NP_009130	NP_082955; NP_001346113
Location (UCSC)	Chr 12: 66.19 – 66.25 Mb	Chr 10: 119.98 – 120.04 Mb
PubMed search
- Wikidata
View/Edit Human	View/Edit Mouse

Interleukin-1 receptor-associated kinase 3 (originally IRAK-M) is an enzyme that in humans is encoded by the IRAK3 gene. The IRAK family of proteins consists of two active serine/threonine kinases IRAK-1 and IRAK-4, as well as two inactive kinases IRAK-2 and IRAK-3. The activity of IRAK-3 is induced by toll-like receptor and interleukin-1 receptor signaling. IRAK-3 acts as a negative regulator for downstream signaling through these pathways by preventing the phosphorylation of IRAK-1 and IRAK-4 or by inhibiting their dissociation from the Mydd88 complex. Using in vivo liposome-mediated delivery of CRISPR/Cas9 plasmid expressing IRAK3 gRNA, IRAK3 was shown to be responsible for endotoxin-induced expression of A20 and VE-cadherin in endothelial cells. Thus, IRAK3 is crucial for maintenance and repair of endothelial barrier after endotoxin-induced lung injury.
