= HCLS1 =

Protein-coding gene in the species Homo sapiens

Identifiers
- Aliases: HCLS1, CTTNL, HS1, lckBP1, p75, hematopoietic cell-specific Lyn substrate 1
- External IDs: OMIM: 601306; MGI: 104568; GeneCards: HCLS1

Gene location (Mouse)
Chr.	Chromosome 16 (mouse)
Band	16|16 B3	Start	36,755,345 bp
Band	16|16 B3	End	36,783,574 bp
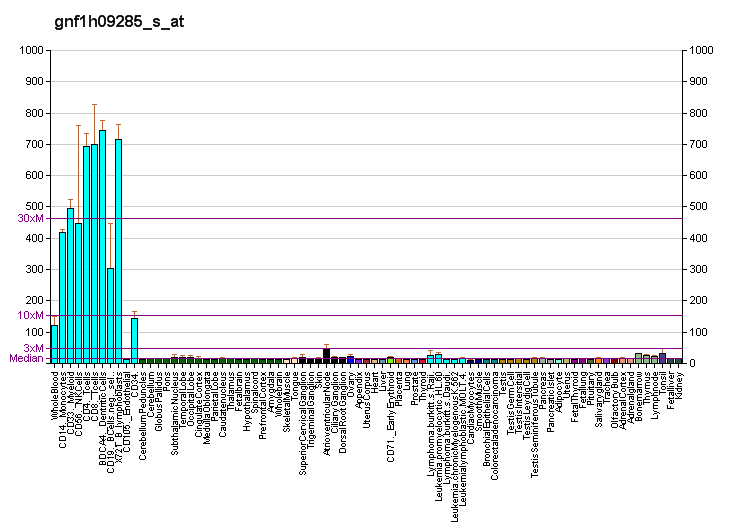

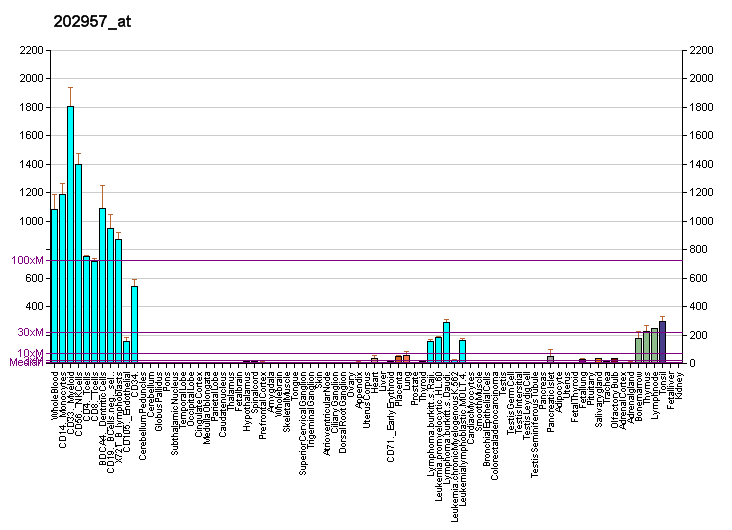
RNA expression pattern
Bgee	Human / Mouse (ortholog); Top expressed in: monocyte; blood; spleen; appendix; bone marrow cell; lymph node; right lung; trabecular bone; upper lobe of left lung; gallbladder / Top expressed in: granulocyte; mesenteric lymph nodes; thymus; spleen; neural layer of retina; bone marrow; stroma of bone marrow; ankle joint; tibiofemoral joint; blood; More reference expression data
BioGPS	More reference expression data
Gene ontology
Molecular function	SH3 domain binding; protein binding; actin binding; protein kinase binding; protein-containing complex binding
Cellular component	cytoplasm; membrane; transcription regulator complex; mitochondrion; nucleus; cytosol; plasma membrane
Biological process	positive regulation of protein kinase B signaling; intracellular signal transduction; regulation of transcription, DNA-templated; positive regulation of tyrosine phosphorylation of STAT protein; positive regulation of macrophage differentiation; negative regulation of transcription by RNA polymerase II; cellular response to cytokine stimulus; positive regulation of peptidyl-serine phosphorylation; regulation of actin filament polymerization; actin filament polymerization; positive regulation of cell population proliferation; positive regulation of peptidyl-tyrosine phosphorylation; positive regulation of granulocyte differentiation; erythrocyte differentiation; negative regulation of leukocyte apoptotic process; response to hormone; positive regulation of phosphatidylinositol 3-kinase signaling; positive regulation of actin cytoskeleton reorganization; positive regulation of transcription by RNA polymerase II; positive regulation of protein import into nucleus; positive regulation of DNA-binding transcription factor activity
Sources:Amigo / QuickGO
Orthologs
Databases	NCBI: entry
Species	Human	Mouse
Entrez	3059	15163
Ensembl	n/a	ENSMUSG00000022831
UniProt	P14317	P49710
RefSeq (mRNA)	NM_005335; NM_001292041	NM_008225
RefSeq (protein)	NP_001278970; NP_005326	NP_032251
Location (UCSC)	n/a	Chr 16: 36.76 – 36.78 Mb
PubMed search
- Wikidata
View/Edit Human	View/Edit Mouse

Hematopoietic lineage cell-specific protein is a protein that in humans is encoded by the HCLS1 gene.

== Interactions ==
HCLS1 has been shown to interact with Caspase 3.
