= Caspase 8 =

Protein found in humans

CASP8
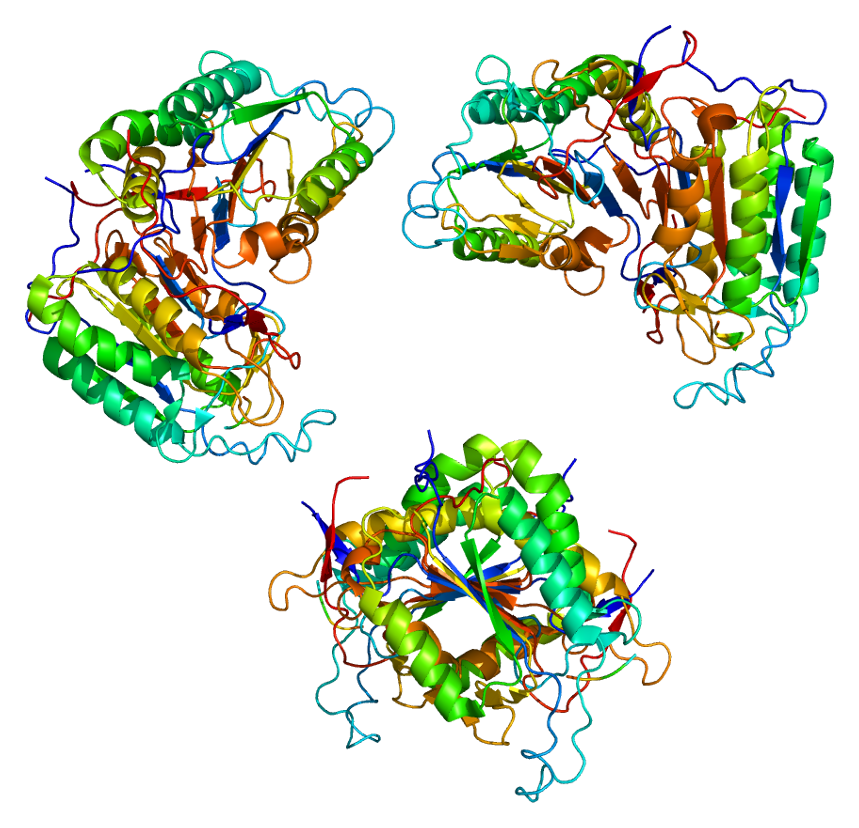

Identifiers
- Aliases: CASP8, ALPS2B, CAP4, Casp-8, FLICE, MACH, MCH5, caspase 8
- External IDs: OMIM: 601763; MGI: 1261423; GeneCards: CASP8
Available structures
PDB	Ortholog search: PDBe RCSB
PDB	List of PDB id codes 1F9E, 1I4E, 1QDU, 1QTN, 2C2Z, 2FUN, 2K7Z, 2Y1L, 3H11, 3KJN, 3KJQ, 4JJ7, 4PRZ, 4PS1, 4ZBW
Enzyme activity
EC #	BRENDA	ExPASy	KEGG	MetaCyc
3.4.22.61	↗	↗	↗	↗

Gene location (Human)
Chr.	Chromosome 2 (human)
Band	2q33.1	Start	201,233,443 bp
Band	2q33.1	End	201,287,711 bp

Gene location (Mouse)
Chr.	Chromosome 1 (mouse)
Band	1 C1.3|1 29.19 cM	Start	58,834,533 bp
Band	1 C1.3|1 29.19 cM	End	58,886,662 bp
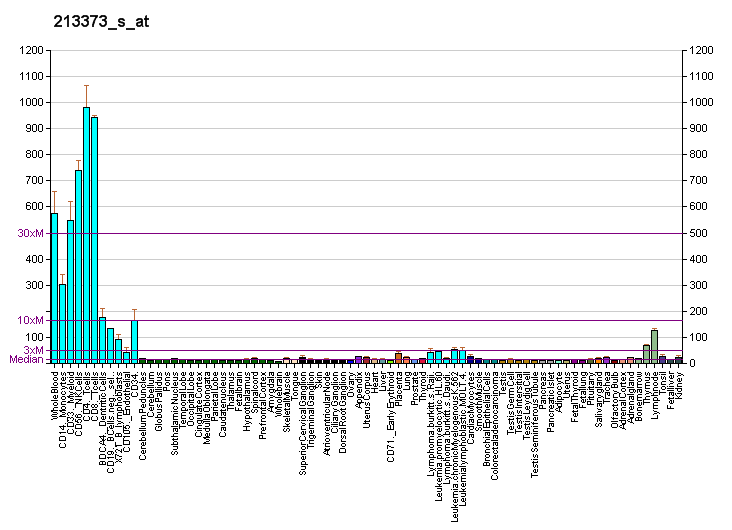

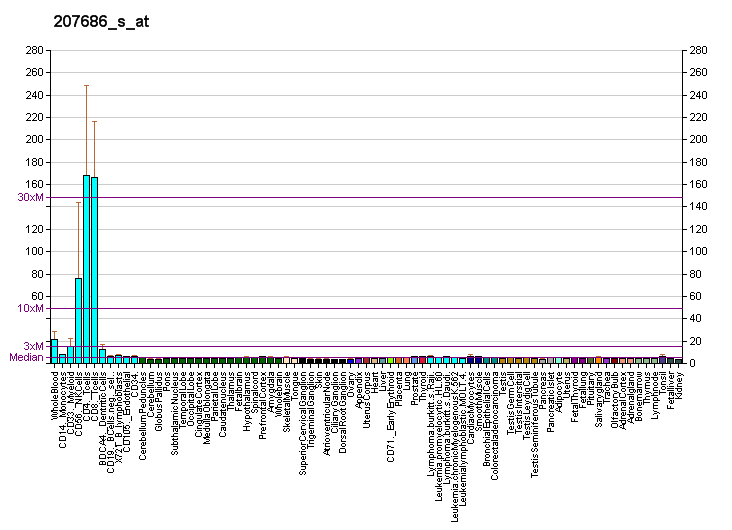
RNA expression pattern
Bgee	Human / Mouse (ortholog); Top expressed in: monocyte; blood; granulocyte; buccal mucosa cell; bone marrow cell; spleen; lymph node; appendix; epithelium of colon; rectum / Top expressed in: jejunum; duodenum; ileum; subcutaneous adipose tissue; parotid gland; lymph node; stroma of bone marrow; spleen; endothelial cell of lymphatic vessel; embryonic cell; More reference expression data
BioGPS	More reference expression data
Gene ontology
Molecular function	death effector domain binding; cysteine-type peptidase activity; cysteine-type endopeptidase activity involved in apoptotic signaling pathway; scaffold protein binding; protein binding; identical protein binding; cysteine-type endopeptidase activity involved in apoptotic process; cysteine-type endopeptidase activity; hydrolase activity; ubiquitin protein ligase binding; peptidase activity; cysteine-type endopeptidase activity involved in execution phase of apoptosis; death receptor binding; tumor necrosis factor receptor binding; protein-containing complex binding
Cellular component	cell body; cytosol; CD95 death-inducing signaling complex; ripoptosome; nucleoplasm; mitochondrial outer membrane; death-inducing signaling complex; membrane raft; neuron projection; cytoskeleton; cytoplasm; mitochondrion; nucleus; protein-containing complex
Biological process	regulation of apoptotic process; response to estradiol; activation of cysteine-type endopeptidase activity involved in apoptotic signaling pathway; response to antibiotic; regulation of tumor necrosis factor-mediated signaling pathway; positive regulation of macrophage differentiation; cellular response to organic cyclic compound; natural killer cell activation; negative regulation of I-kappaB kinase/NF-kappaB signaling; TRAIL-activated apoptotic signaling pathway; proteolysis; macrophage differentiation; TRIF-dependent toll-like receptor signaling pathway; response to tumor necrosis factor; B cell activation; cell surface receptor signaling pathway; response to lipopolysaccharide; cellular response to mechanical stimulus; activation of cysteine-type endopeptidase activity; positive regulation of protein insertion into mitochondrial membrane involved in apoptotic signaling pathway; death-inducing signaling complex assembly; positive regulation of proteolysis; positive regulation of I-kappaB kinase/NF-kappaB signaling; apoptotic signaling pathway; response to cold; regulation of extrinsic apoptotic signaling pathway via death domain receptors; viral process; response to ethanol; response to cobalt ion; activation of cysteine-type endopeptidase activity involved in apoptotic process; proteolysis involved in cellular protein catabolic process; syncytiotrophoblast cell differentiation involved in labyrinthine layer development; nucleotide-binding oligomerization domain containing signaling pathway; T cell activation; suppression by virus of host cysteine-type endopeptidase activity involved in apoptotic process; apoptotic process; extrinsic apoptotic signaling pathway; negative regulation of extrinsic apoptotic signaling pathway via death domain receptors; regulation of necroptotic process; execution phase of apoptosis; toll-like receptor 3 signaling pathway; positive regulation of neuron death; extrinsic apoptotic signaling pathway via death domain receptors; positive regulation of interleukin-1 beta production
Sources:Amigo / QuickGO
Orthologs
Databases	NCBI: entry; OMA: entry
Species	Human	Mouse
Entrez	841	12370
Ensembl	ENSG00000064012	ENSMUSG00000026029
UniProt	Q14790	O89110
RefSeq (mRNA)	NM_001080124; NM_001080125; NM_001228; NM_033355; NM_033356 NM_033357; NM_033358; NM_001372051	NM_001080126; NM_001277926; NM_009812
RefSeq (protein)	NP_001073593; NP_001073594; NP_001219; NP_203519; NP_203520 NP_203522; NP_001358980	NP_001073595; NP_001264855; NP_033942
Location (UCSC)	Chr 2: 201.23 – 201.29 Mb	Chr 1: 58.83 – 58.89 Mb
PubMed search
- Wikidata
View/Edit Human	View/Edit Mouse

Caspase-8 is a caspase protein, encoded by the CASP8 gene. It most likely acts upon caspase-3. CASP8 orthologs have been identified in numerous mammals for which complete genome data are available. These unique orthologs are also present in birds.

== Function ==
The CASP8 gene encodes a member of the cysteine-aspartic acid protease (caspase) family. Sequential activation of caspases plays a central role in the execution-phase of cell apoptosis. Caspases exist as inactive proenzymes composed of a prodomain, a large protease subunit, and a small protease subunit. Activation of caspases requires proteolytic processing at conserved internal aspartic residues to generate a heterodimeric enzyme consisting of the large and small subunits. This protein is involved in the programmed cell death induced by Fas and various apoptotic stimuli. The N-terminal FADD-like death effector domain of this protein suggests that it may interact with Fas-interacting protein FADD. This protein was detected in the insoluble fraction of the affected brain region from Huntington disease patients but not in those from normal controls, which implicated the role in neurodegenerative diseases. Many alternatively spliced transcript variants encoding different isoforms have been described, although not all variants have had their full-length sequences determined.

== Clinical significance ==
A very rare genetic disorder of the immune system can also be caused by mutations in this gene. This disease, called CEDS, stands for “Caspase eight deficiency state.” CEDS has features similar to ALPS, another genetic disease of apoptosis, with the addition of an immunodeficient phenotype. Thus, the clinical manifestations include splenomegaly and lymphadenopathy, in addition to recurrent sinopulmonary infections, recurrent mucocutaneous herpesvirus, persistent warts and molluscum contagiosum infections, and hypogammaglobulinemia. There is sometimes lymphocytic infiltrative disease in parenchymal organs, but autoimmunity is minimal and lymphoma has not been observed in the CEDS patients. CEDS is inherited in an autosomal recessive manner.

The clinical phenotype of CEDS patients represented a paradox since caspase-8 was considered to be chiefly a proapoptotic protease, that was mainly involved in signal transduction from Tumor necrosis factor receptor family death receptors such as Fas. The defect in lymphocyte activation and protective immunity suggested that caspase-8 had additional signaling roles in lymphocytes. Further work revealed that caspase-8 was essential for the induction of the transcription factor “nuclear factor κB” (NF-κB) after stimulation through antigen receptors, Fc receptors, or Toll-like receptor 4 in T, B, and natural killer cells.

Biochemically, caspase-8 was found to enter the complex of the inhibitor of NF-κB kinase (IKK) with the upstream Bcl10-MALT1 (mucosa-associated lymphatic tissue) adapter complex which were crucial for the induction of nuclear translocation of NF-κB. Moreover, the biochemical form of caspase-8 differed in the two pathways. For the death pathway, the caspase-8 zymogen is cleaved into subunits that assemble to form the mature, highly active caspase heterotetramer whereas for the activation pathway, the zymogen appears to remain intact perhaps to limit its proteolytic function but enhance its capability as an adapter protein.

== Interactions ==
Caspase-8 has been shown to interact with:

- BCAP31,
- BID,
- Bcl-2,
- CFLAR,
- Caspase-10,
- Caspase-2,
- Caspase-3,
- Caspase-6,
- Caspase-7,
- Caspase-9,
- DEDD,
- FADD,
- FasL,
- FasR,
- IFT57,
- NOL3,
- PEA15,
- RIPK1,
- Src,
- TNFRSF10B, and
- TRAF1.

== Additional photos ==
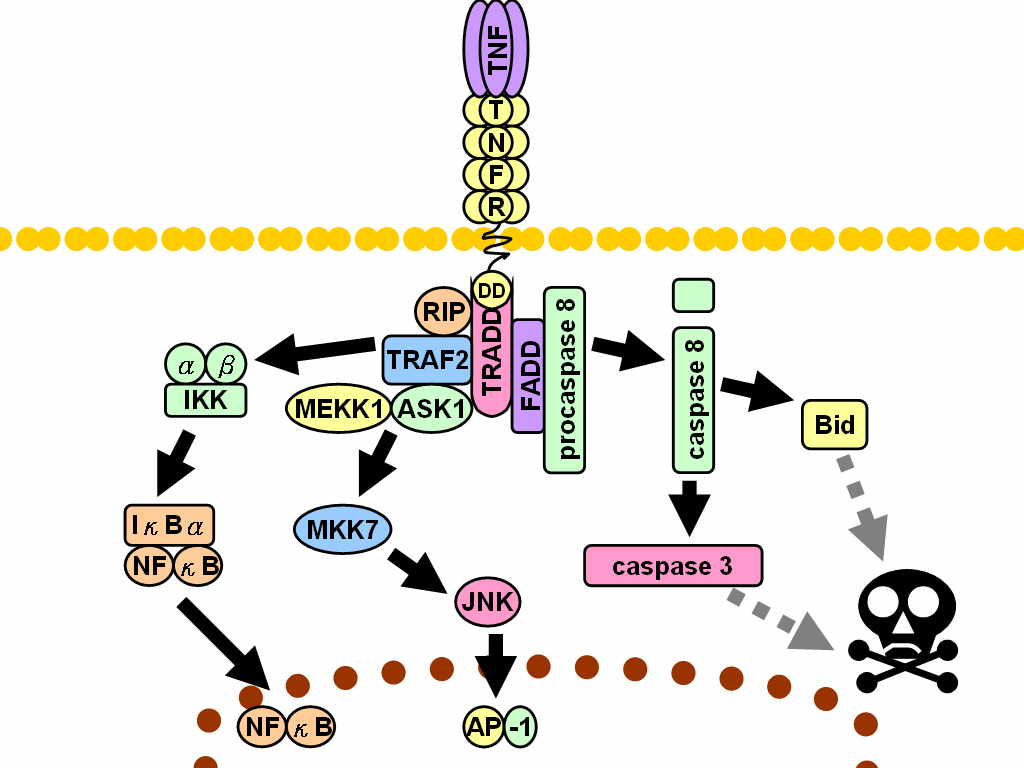
Signaling pathway of TNF-R1. Dashed grey lines represent multiple steps

Overview of signal transduction pathways involved in apoptosis.

== See also ==
- Caspase
- FADD
- The Proteolysis Map
