= Caspase 10 =

Enzyme found in humans

CASP10

Identifiers
- Aliases: CASP10, ALPS2, FLICE2, MCH4, Caspase 10, FLICE-2
- External IDs: OMIM: 601762; GeneCards: CASP10
Enzyme activity
EC #	BRENDA	ExPASy	KEGG	MetaCyc
3.4.22.63	↗	↗	↗	↗

Gene location (Human)
Chr.	Chromosome 2 (human)
Band	2q33.1	Start	201,182,872 bp
Band	2q33.1	End	201,229,428 bp
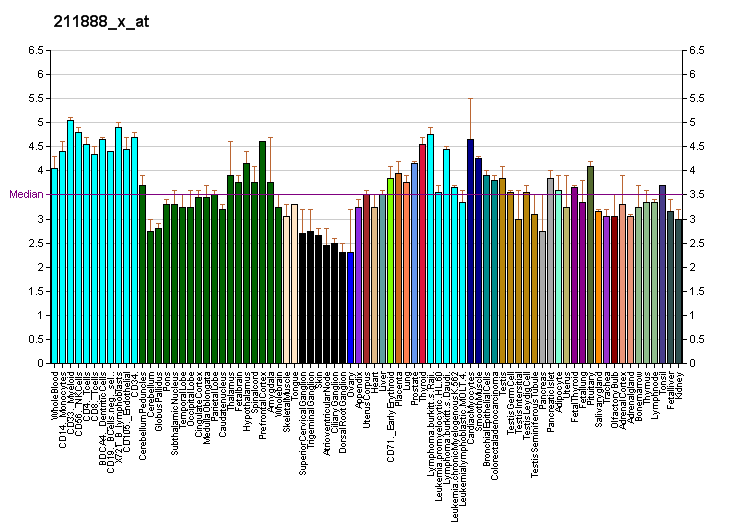

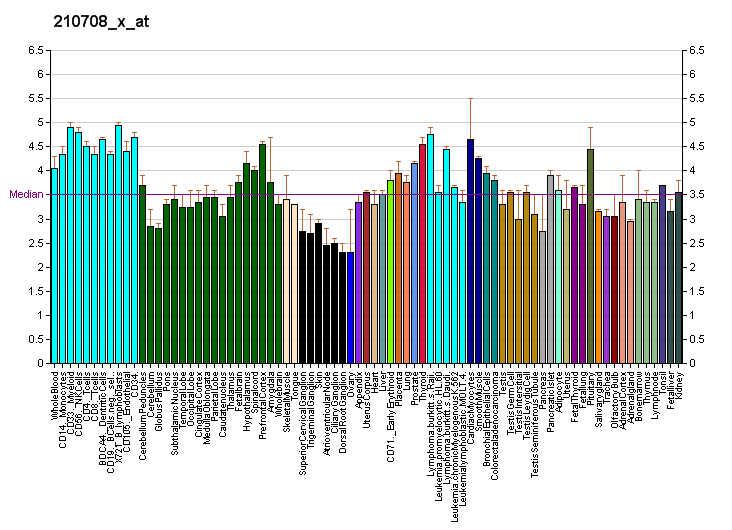

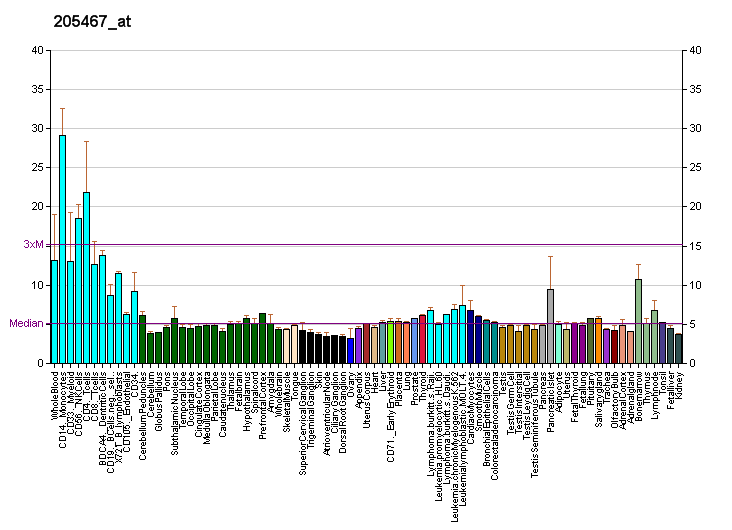
RNA expression pattern
Bgee	Human / Mouse (ortholog); Top expressed in: epithelium of colon; granulocyte; monocyte; rectum; buccal mucosa cell; spleen; bone marrow cell; blood; Achilles tendon; upper lobe of left lung / n/a; More reference expression data
BioGPS	More reference expression data
Gene ontology
Molecular function	death effector domain binding; peptidase activity; cysteine-type peptidase activity; protein binding; hydrolase activity; ubiquitin protein ligase binding; cysteine-type endopeptidase activity involved in execution phase of apoptosis; cysteine-type endopeptidase activity; cysteine-type endopeptidase activity involved in apoptotic signaling pathway; cysteine-type endopeptidase activity involved in apoptotic process
Cellular component	ripoptosome; cytosol; CD95 death-inducing signaling complex; cytoplasm
Biological process	positive regulation of I-kappaB kinase/NF-kappaB signaling; apoptotic signaling pathway; cell surface receptor signaling pathway; proteolysis; apoptotic process; regulation of apoptotic process; execution phase of apoptosis; activation of cysteine-type endopeptidase activity involved in apoptotic process
Sources:Amigo / QuickGO
Orthologs
Databases	NCBI: entry; OMA: entry
Species	Human	Mouse
Entrez	843	n/a
Ensembl	ENSG00000003400	n/a
UniProt	Q92851	n/a
RefSeq (mRNA)	NM_001206524; NM_001206542; NM_001230; NM_001306083; NM_032974 NM_032976; NM_032977	n/a
RefSeq (protein)	NP_001193453; NP_001193471; NP_001221; NP_001293012; NP_116756 NP_116758; NP_116759	n/a
Location (UCSC)	Chr 2: 201.18 – 201.23 Mb	n/a
PubMed search		n/a
- Wikidata
View/Edit Human

Caspase-10 is an enzyme that, in humans, is encoded by the CASP10 gene.

This gene encodes a protein that is a member of the cysteine-aspartic acid protease (caspase) family. Sequential activation of caspases plays a central role in the execution-phase of cell apoptosis. Caspases exist as inactive proenzymes that undergo proteolytic processing at conserved aspartic residues to produce two subunits, large and small, that dimerize to form the active enzyme.

That protein cleaves and activates caspases 3 and 7, and the protein itself is processed by caspase 8. Mutations in this gene are associated with apoptosis defects seen in type II autoimmune lymphoproliferative syndrome. Three alternatively spliced transcript variants encoding different isoforms have been described for this gene.

== Interactions ==
Caspase 10 has been shown to interact with FADD, CFLAR, Caspase 8, Fas receptor, RYBP, TNFRSF1A and TNFRSF10B.

== See also ==
- The Proteolysis Map
