= The Proteolysis Map =

Integrated web resource focused on proteases

PMAP logo

The Proteolysis MAP (PMAP) was an integrated web resource focused on proteases. Its domain now links to a scam/spam browser extender.

== Rationale ==
PMAP was designed to aid the protease researchers in reasoning about proteolytic networks and metabolic pathways.

== History and funding ==
PMAP was originally created at the Burnham Institute for Medical Research, La Jolla, California. In 2004 the National Institutes of Health (NIH) selected a team led by Jeffrey W. Smith, to establish the Center on Proteolytic Pathways (CPP). As part of the NIH Roadmap for Biomedical research, the center develops technology to study the behavior of proteins and to disseminate that knowledge to the scientific community at large.

== Focal point ==
Proteases are a class of enzymes that regulate much of what happens in the human body, both inside the cell and out, by cleaving peptide bonds in proteins. Through this activity, they govern the four essential cell functions: differentiation, motility, division and cell death — and activate important extracellular episodes, such as the biochemical cascade effect in blood clotting. Life could not exist without them. Extensive on-line classification system for proteases (also referred as peptidases) is deposited in the MEROPS database.

== Goal ==
Proteolytic pathways, or proteolysis, are the series of events controlled by proteases that occur in response to specific stimuli. The clotting of blood and production of insulin can be viewed as proteolytic pathways. The activation, regulation and inhibition of the protein are protease reactions to changing glucose levels and trigger other proteases downstream.

== Database content ==
PMAP integrates five databases. ProteaseDB and SubstrateDB, are driven by an automated annotation pipeline that generates dynamic 'Molecule Pages', rich in molecular information. CutDB has information on more than 6,600 proteolytic events, and ProfileDB is dedicated to information of the substrate recognition specificity of proteases. PathwayDB has begun accumulation of metabolic pathways whose function can be dynamically modeled in a rule-based manner. Hypothetical networks are inferred by semi-automated culling from the literature. Protease software tools may help analyze individual proteases and proteome-wide datasets.

== Usage ==
Popular destinations in PMAP are Protease Molecule Pages and Substrate Molecule Pages. Protease Molecule Pages show recent news in PubMed literature of the protease, known proteolytic events, protein domain location and protein structure view, as well as a cross annotation in other bioinformatic databases section. Substrate Molecule Pages display protein domains and experimentally derived protease cut-sites for a given protein target of interest.

== See also ==
- Cytoscape
- Computational genomics
- Metabolic network modelling
- Protein–protein interaction prediction
