= Death regulator Nedd2-like caspase =

Type of cysteine protease

Death regulator Nedd2-like caspase (Dronc)
- Animation of the crystal structure of the Dronc caspase zymogen.

Identifiers
- Organism: Drosophila melanogaster
- Symbol: CG8091
- Alt. symbols: Nc, Nedd2-like caspase, caspase-9
- Orthologs: OMA: entry
- PDB: 2FP3
- UniProt: Q9XYF4

Other data
- EC number: K20009
- Chromosome: 3L: 9.97 - 9.97 Mb
Search for
- Structures: Swiss-model
- Domains: InterPro

Death regulator Nedd2-like caspase (Nc, Nedd2-like caspase or Dronc) was firstly identified and characterised in Drosophila in 1999 as a cysteine protease containing an amino-terminal caspase recruitment domain. At first, it was thought of as an effector caspase involved in apoptosis, but subsequent findings have proved that it is, in fact, an initiator caspase with a crucial role in said type of programmed cell death.

== Structure ==
Caspase Dronc is a Drosophila melanogaster protein codified by the Dronc gene. It belongs to the cysteine-aspartic proteases family, as it is a protease enzyme that takes part in programmed cell death processes. It is composed of beta-sheet structures surrounded by alpha-helices, which is a common feature in the protein family. Caspases are formed by ensembled or single active heterodimers that come from the intra-chain proteolytic cleavage of inactive zymogens. This cleavage is coordinated by a specific initiator caspase (which undergoes adaptor-assisted self-activation) for each effector caspase. A common feature among initiator caspases is the presence of a long amino-terminal domain with intermolecular interaction motifs such as the caspase recruiting domain (CARD).

Five caspases have been identified in Drosophila. Two of these present long prodomains (structural domains of the caspases) and are considered to be initiator caspases (Dronc and DCP-2 / DREDD). The other three (DCP-1, DrICE and DECAY), which have short prodomains, act as effector caspases activated by initiator caspases. The uncleaved Dronc zymogen is only presented as a monomer, while the autocleaved protein forms a homodimer. It is presumed that its autocatalytic cleavage activates the protein by generating a dimerisation in which both monomers stabilise their active sites mutually. Caspase Dronc's active site is located between positions 271 and 318 of the protein sequence.

=== Genetics ===
The Dronc gene is located in the 3L chromosome of the fly, between the 9,968,479 bp and the 9,971,002 bp. It transcripts one single polypeptide and there are 66 reported alleles of the gene. Two mutations have been found in the positions 150 and 184, respectively. The Dronc protein has a length of 450 amino acids and a mass of 51,141 Da.

COMPLETE DRONC SEQUENCE
	11	21	31	41
MQPPELEIGM	PKRHREHIRK	NLNILVEWTN	YERLAMECVQ	QGILTVQMLR
51	61	71	81	91
NTQDLNGKPF	NMDEKDVRVE	QHRRLLLKIT	QRGPTAYNLL	INALRNINCL
101	111	121	131	141
DAAVLLESVD	ESDSRPPFIS	LNERRTSRKS	ADIVDTPSPE	ASEGPCVSKL
151	161	171	181	191
RNEPLGALTP	YVGVVDGPEV	KKSKKIHGGD	SAILGTYKMQ	SRFNRGVLLM
201	211	221	231	241
VNIMDYPDQN	RRRIGAEKDS	KSLIHLFQEL	NFTIFPYGNV	NQDQFFKLLT
251	261	271	281	291
MVTSSSYVQN	TECFVMVLMT	HGNSVEGKEK	VEFCDGSVVD	MQKIKDHFQT
301	311	321	331	341
AKCPYLVNKP	KVLMFPFCRG	DEYDLGHPKN	QGNLMEPVYT	AQEEKWPDTQ
351	361	371	381	391
TEGIPSPSTN	VPSLADTLVC	YANTPGYVTH	RDLDTGSWYI	QKFCQVMADH
401	411	421	431	441
AHDTDLEDIL	KKTSEAVGNK	RTKKGSMQTG	AYDNLGFNKK	LYFNPGFFNE

=== Human orthologs ===
Although most human caspases are considered orthologs of caspase Dronc, the one that resembles it the most is Caspase-2. However, Nedd2-like caspase is the functional homolog of mammalian Caspase-9.

== Location ==
Figure 1. The apoptosome is a ring-like multisubunit complex assembled upon receiving a pro-apoptotic signal. In Drosophila, Dark gathers two bundled rings of eight subunits each. This scaffold attaches Adenosine diphosphate (ADP) and an initiator caspase (Dronc in D. melanogaster), which in turn further advances the signalling cascade by cleaving of the effector caspase(s). Crystal structure of D. melanogaster's apoptosome.

Due to its function and its mostly hydrophilic character, Dronc can be located in the apoptosome, the plasma membrane and the nucleus of the cell. Cells containing this protein have been found in the following structures of the Drosophila melanogaster: extended germ band embryo; eye disc; foregut primordium; germline cyst; and gut section.

== Activation ==
The activation of caspases is a fundamental step required to execute apoptosis. Initiator caspases, such as Dronc, which is the only initiator caspase in Drosophila melanogaster, are activated through different mechanisms, the main one being autocleavage. Understanding how caspases are activated is a crucial element in order to come up with therapeutic treatments triggering specific caspases. For instance, it has been shown that mice missing or having inactivated caspase-9 present several neurological impairments and have a faulty response to cell damage. Just as caspase 9 in mammals, caspase Dronc is a protein that has a caspase activation and recruitment domain (CARD). It is the only Drosophila caspase presenting this domain: this can represent the possibility of establishing a valuable comparison between their activation or inhibition mechanisms.

=== Activation ===
==== Autocleavage ====
To activate zymogen at first, caspase Dronc autocleaves at residue E352 (Glu352, a glutamic acid residue). Autocleavage at this residue induces dimerization and stabilization of the active site. Autocleavage at E352 results in Pr1, which weighs 40kDa. One study showed that, in Drosophila melanogaster S2 cells, Dronc autocleavage is essential for the zymogen activation. Even though caspase Dronc goes through other processes which will be discussed later, Dronc autocleavage was found to be absolutely necessary to induce apoptosis, whereas other cell cofactors seemed to not be enough to induce activation of Dronc if it had not previously been autocleaved at residue E352. After autocleavage, catalytic activity of Dronc is drastically higher than that of the zymogen. However, these results seem to be contradictory with those of another study conducted in BG2 cells. This study concluded that autocleavage at residue E352, just as autocleavage at other sites such as E143, is not needed for Dronc to activate and, consequently, to induce apoptosis.

==== Processing by DrICE ====
Dronc can also be cleaved by the effector caspase DrICE, which is activated by caspase Dronc itself after autocleavage. However, it has also been suggested that caspases other than Dronc could activate DrICE. Even though uncleavable mutations of Dronc may have the ability to process caspase DrICE, it is autocleaved Dronc that processes caspase DrICE in Drosophila melanogaster cells. Cleavage of Dronc by DrICE occurs at residue D135 (Asp135, an aspartic acid residue). At the beginning of apoptosis, full-length Dronc and autocleaved Dronc, Pr1, are present and can be used as a substrate for DrICE processing. Cleavage at residue D135 can therefore result in two products: cleavage of Dronc Pr1 results in fully processed Dronc, whereas cleavage of full Dronc results in Pr2, which weights 36kDa. However, since Dronc Pr1 seems to be the most abundant during early stages of apoptosis, most caspase Dronc ends up being fully processed.

==== Interaction with apoptosome ====
In humans, initiator caspases such as Caspase-2 and Caspase-9 have a prodomain that cleaves caspases to a holoenzyme complex in order to activate the protein. These caspases have a caspase recruitment domain (CARD) that allows them to interact with Apaf-1. The Drosophila melanogaster Apaf-1 homolog, Dark, forms an oligomer with eight Dark chains when dATP is present. This complex is called the apoptosome. Dark, just as Apaf-1, has an N-terminal CARD domain that interacts with caspase Dronc, which is incorporated into this protein complex that will induce cell death.

Recruitment of Dronc by Dark seems to facilitate Dronc autocleavage at residue E352. Dark might not be enough on its own to activate caspase Dronc; it has been suggested that other factors could increase the activation of Dronc (and DrICE) through interaction with the apoptosome. However, in Drosophila melanogaster cells, Dark activity is necessary for normal execution of apoptosis.

=== Inhibition ===
==== Ubiquitylation ====
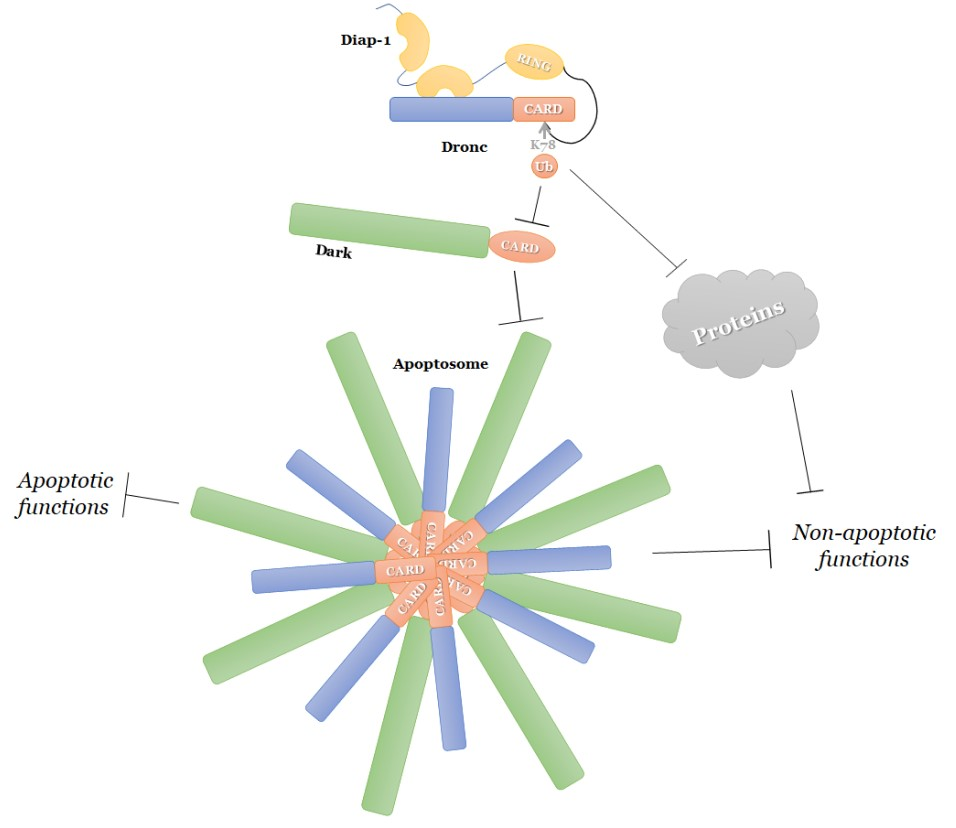
Figure 2. Regulation of Dronc's activity through mono-ubiquitylation. At K78, Diap-1 mono-ubiquitylates Dronc which exists the initiator caspase's CARD domain. Dronc 's association with Dark and thereby apoptosome formation is impeded by said ubiquitylation. It has inhibitory repercussions for both Dronc's apoptotic and non-apoptotic roles, since apoptosome formation is essential for the protease's activation. K78 mono-ubiquitylation may be capable of blocking interactions with some proteins which can have a detrimental impact on Dronc's non-apoptotic functions.

Activation of Dronc is also monitored by ubiquitylation. (see figure 2) Ubiquitylation is a modification that happens after protein translation: in this process, protein ubiquitin conjugates to a lysine residue. However, the exact mechanism of Dronc ubiquitylation remains partially unknown to this day. In Drosophila melanogaster cells, mono-ubiquitylation on residue K78 (located in the CARD domain) is carried in caspase Dronc. Ubiquitylation of this residue of the CARD domain, which interacts with the apoptosome during apoptosis, keeps Dronc from activating in the apoptosome and prevents apoptosis of the cell. Ubiquitylation by E3 ubiquitin ligase activity of Diap-1 negatively regulates Dronc activity. Even a partial decrease in ubiquitylation is already enough to importantly rise Dronc activity. Moreover, it has also been shown that K78 mono-ubiquitylation assumes an inhibitory role in Dronc's non-apoptotic capacities, which may not need its catalytic movement, but still being significant for the endurance of the fruit fly. In Drosophila melanogaster cells, caspase Dronc is ubiquitylated by Diap-1. Similarly, effector caspases Caspase-3 and Caspase-7 are monoubiquitylated by cIAP2 in vitro.

==== Diap-1 ====
Inhibitor of Apoptosis Proteins (IAPs) are a family of proteins that act as endogenous inhibitors of apoptosis: they inhibit caspases. Diap-1 is the Drosophila melanogaster IAP that interacts with both Dronc and DrICE through IAP domains. Some studies have found that Diap-1 inhibits and degrades caspase Dronc, and impairment of Diap-1 interaction with Dronc would prevent the caspase from degrading.

Diap-1 regulates caspase activity in Drosophila melanogaster, thus making Dronc activation dependent on removing Diap-1. Diap-1 is the protein that inhibits both Dronc and DrICE, and prevents apoptosis from being executed. Removal of Diap-1 RNAi triggers caspase activation and, thus, apoptosis. Moreover, during apoptosis, removal of Diap-1 facilitates interaction between Dronc and Dark, which supports the fact that Diap-1 is charged of regulating and inhibiting caspase Dronc. In fact, during apoptosis, proteosomal degradation of Diap-1 takes place (and is necessary) right before cleavage and activation of caspases Dronc and DrICE. Finally, binding of Diap-1 seems to not be sufficient for Dronc inhibition; it seems that ubiquitylation the RING domain of Diap-1 is necessary for complete inhibition of Dronc.

== Functions ==
Caspase Dronc has an essential catalytic activity. It is defined as a cysteine protease (or thiol protease), which means that a nucleophilic cysteine thiol forms a catalytic triad (Cys–His–Asn) at the active site of the enzyme that intercedes in the catalysis. The main function of this kind of endopeptidases is to catalyze the hydrolysis of peptide bonds in order to cleave proteins into smaller fragments (see figure 3). For that reason, Nedd2-like caspase is responsible for the activation of effector caspases. On the other hand, as a caspase, Dronc is fully involved in programmed cell death (PCD) processes, which have repercussions in regulative and reproductive functions of the Drosophila melanogaster.

=== Apoptotic functions ===
Apoptosis is an essential process for the development of multicellular organisms. Its role is to remove excess cells during development (e.g. sculpting the digits of vertebrates), as well as being responsible for detaching damaged, potentially dangerous, cells. Because of its extreme importance, this pathway has been shown to be vastly conserved throughout evolution. One event that is capable of triggering this type of programmed cell death is the activation of the JNK (c-Jun N-terminal kinase) signalling pathway, due to stress caused by chromosomal instability (CIN).

Figure 3. Reaction mechanism of the cysteine protease-mediated cleavage of a peptide bond.

The apoptosis pathway is regulated by caspases, a family of proteases that lead to the disassembling of the cell by cleaving protein targets following an aspartate residue. In response to certain apoptotic stimuli, the inactive caspases zymogens turn into active enzymes that start a cascade of caspases-induced proteolytic cleavage processes which culminate with the DNA decomposition and the cell death. Next, neighbouring cells or macrophages engulf whatever is left of the dwindled cell (often called apoptotic bodies) in order to minimize its effect on the surrounding ones, and at the same time to avoid inducing an immune response in the body. Studies link failure of apoptosis activation with the development of some types of cancer.

Specifically, in the context of the apoptotic signalling cascade, Dronc's role as an initiator caspase consists in the activation of effector caspases such as DrICE or Dcp-1. Nonetheless, Dronc has been found to be a surprisingly efficient catalyst, with a kinetic performance one hundred and eightyfold lesser than that of caspase-9. Hence, akin to caspase 9's behaviour, an adequate enzymatic activity might demand the formation of a holoenzyme complex involving close associations with Dark, Apaf-1's Drosophila ortholog.

==== Comparison of the main apoptotic machinery ====
The diagram (figure 4) shows functional homologues of apoptotic proteins (colour-coded correspondence) in Drosophila melanogaster and mammals.

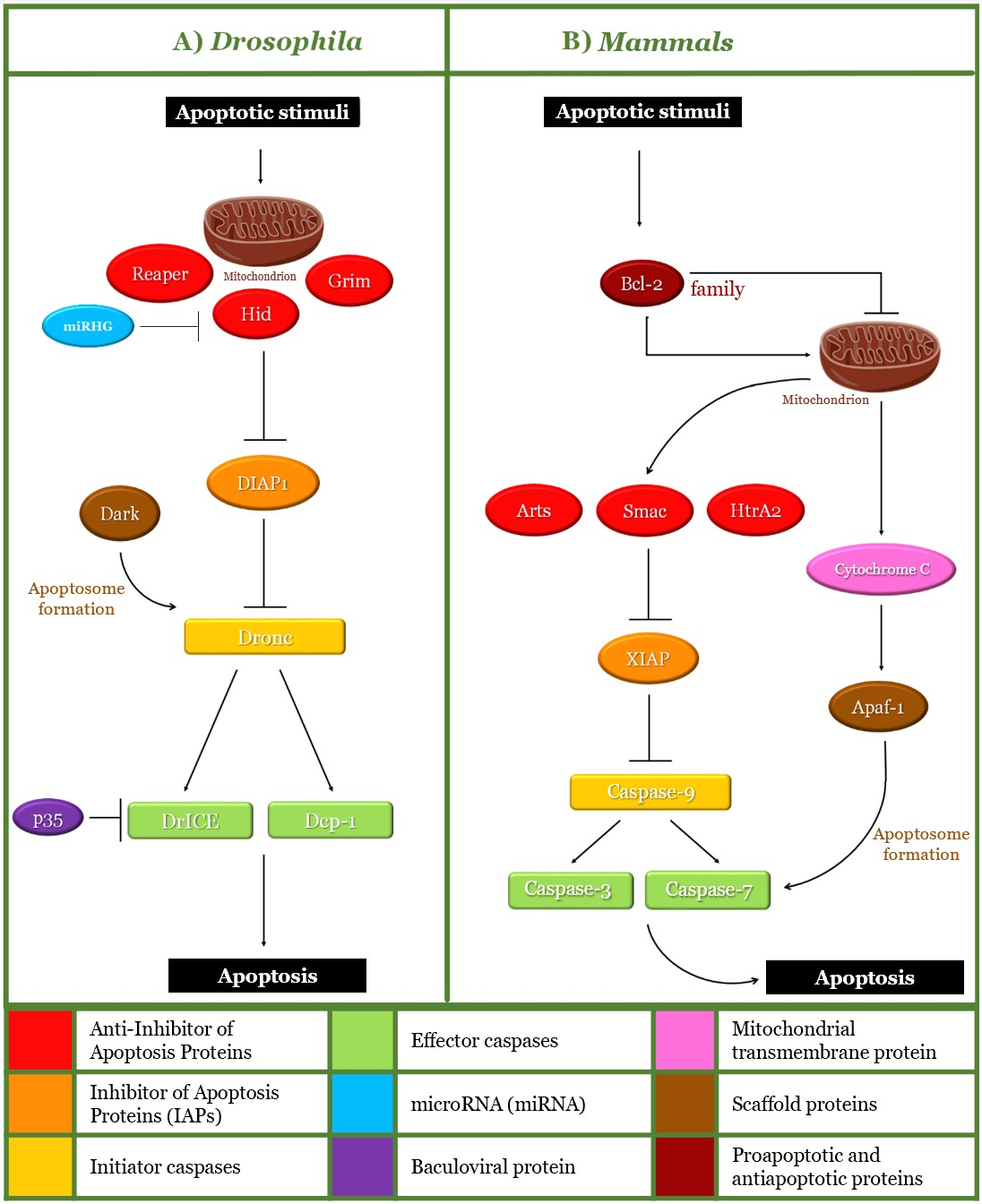
Figure 4. Comparison of the core apoptotic machinery involved in its intrinsic pathways in Drosophila and mammals.

A) Drosophila: In individuals of the Drosophila genus numerous signalling pathways in charge of regulating anti-IAPs Reaper, Hid, and Grim (RHG), Dark scaffold proteins, and Dronc initiator caspases. On the one hand, RHG expression causes the degradation of Diap-1, Inhibitors of apoptosis proteins (IAPs) and the release of Dronc initiator caspases. On the other hand, it allows it to associate with Dark scaffold proteins to form a functional apoptosome and activate the DrICE and Dcp-1 effector caspases. Both pathways are necessary to properly activate caspases and are coordinately regulated. Of note is the existence of the protein from a p35 baculovirus, which has the ability to suppress them, thus blocking the pathway.

B) Mammals: Among members of the class Mammalia, the balance between members of the pro- and anti-apoptotic Bcl-2 family is a key factor in the commitment to apoptosis by regulating the release of cytochrome and IAP antagonists of mitochondria. The binding of cyt c to Apaf-1 promotes apoptosome assembly, which in turn groups and activates caspase-9s. In the end, anti-IAPs release the IAPs proteins (mainly XIAPs).

==== Development (Metamorphosis) ====
Apoptosis can be triggered by extrinsic or intrinsic signals. Both of them occur in Drosophila during its development. For example, a higher concentration of ecdysones (common during the metamorphosis) leads cuticle deposition and larval moults, as well as puparium formation and histolysis of larval midgut. This hormone causes head evasion as well as cell death of larval salivary gland. It is thought that ecdysone induced apoptosis is regulated by the Caspase Dronc. This protein conducts Rpc- and Grim-induced apoptosis, but not Hid-. Regarding other developmental processes, apoptosis conducts the ratio of stem cell-like neuroblasts in the central nervous system.

Additionally, research shows that through the employment the iRNA (RNA interference) mechanism, budding Drosophila embryos have displayed a striking reduction of cell death processes, thus demonstrating that Dronc is important for programmed cell death during embryogenesis. The outcome of said experiments results lead to believe that D. melanogaster's initiator caspase plays an essential role in mediating PCD.

==== Accidental Cell Death and Compensatory Proliferation ====
Cell death during animal tissues development is rapidly compensated by cell divisions in a process called compensatory proliferation. The developing Drosophila imaginal disk has a very high regenerative capacity that is independent of the size control mechanism that governs the disk. It is not completely known how these phenomena are regulated, but it is thought that dying cells secrete mitogens that activate the reproduction of neighbouring cells, a process that would be regulated by apoptotic signalling pathway (in which Caspase Dronc is involved). This means that if cells were stimulated to undergo apoptosis, and at the same time artificially kept alive (e.g. by overexpressing the inhibitor of effector caspases, p35), neighbouring cells would be led to conduct uncontrollable compensatory proliferation. The fact that Dronc is insensitive to p35 inhibition has suggested that it could be required for compensatory proliferation, a hypothesis that was demonstrated in 2006.

=== Non-apoptotic functions ===
==== Promoting DNA damage signalling ====
In addition to its role in apoptosis and compensatory proliferation, Caspase Dronc promotes DNA damage signalling by facilitating γH2Av activity, a variation of histone H2Ax whose phosphorylation marks DNA damage and repairs it by recruiting DNA repair machinery. Thus, Dronc would be involved in both DDR and apoptosis depending on its availability and the needs of the organism.

== Involvement in genetic pathologies ==
=== Cancer ===
Tissue homeostasis can be defined as the maintenance of a balance between cell division and PCD, resulting in the tissue in question maintaining a relatively constant number of cells. In case it gets disturbed, two things could happen. The first would be for the cells to die faster than they can divide, which would result in tissue atrophy. Alternatively, if programmed cell death were blocked in some of the cells, they would not die enough and would end up triggering carcinogenesis in the tissue. For this reason, apoptosis evasion has been identified as a key hallmark of cancer.

As previously mentioned, caspases have a decisive implication in the initiation and execution of apoptosis. Therefore, it is reasonable to think that at low levels they can cause decreased apoptosis and carcinogenesis. Somatic mutations in caspase-3 were detected at fairly low frequencies in certain human cancers, like colon and stomach cancer and non-Hodgkin's lymphoma (NHL). Furthermore, decreased caspase 9 (a human Dronc ortholog) expression has also been linked to 46% of colon cancers.

=== Alzheimer's disease ===
Caspase-2 could have an implication in neurodegenerative disorders such as Alzheimer's disease. Latest evidence has shown that Tau's Caspase-2 cleavage results in the decline of Alzheimer's memory function. Notably, Dronc-dependent Tau cleavage was also shown in an experiment that connected circadian rhythm and Alzheimer's disease. To boot, it was also discovered that Tau expression mediated by the initiator caspase in question could induce a rough eye phenotype due to degeneration of photoreceptor neurons of Drosophila melanogaster.

=== Oxidative stress and ageing ===
An experiment questioning the impact of apoptosis on ageing found that caspase-2-deficient mice displayed shortened life-span and elevated characteristics associated with ageing. Further research has established that caspase-2 plays a role in oxidative stress response, mitochondrial function regulation and metabolic pathways, which may be potential mechanisms through which said caspase regulates ageing. Concurrently, Dronc null mutant flies, also perished within a few days after hatching. In addition, another review has shown that aging flies have raised activated Dronc levels.
