= PIDD1 =

Protein-coding gene in the species Homo sapiens

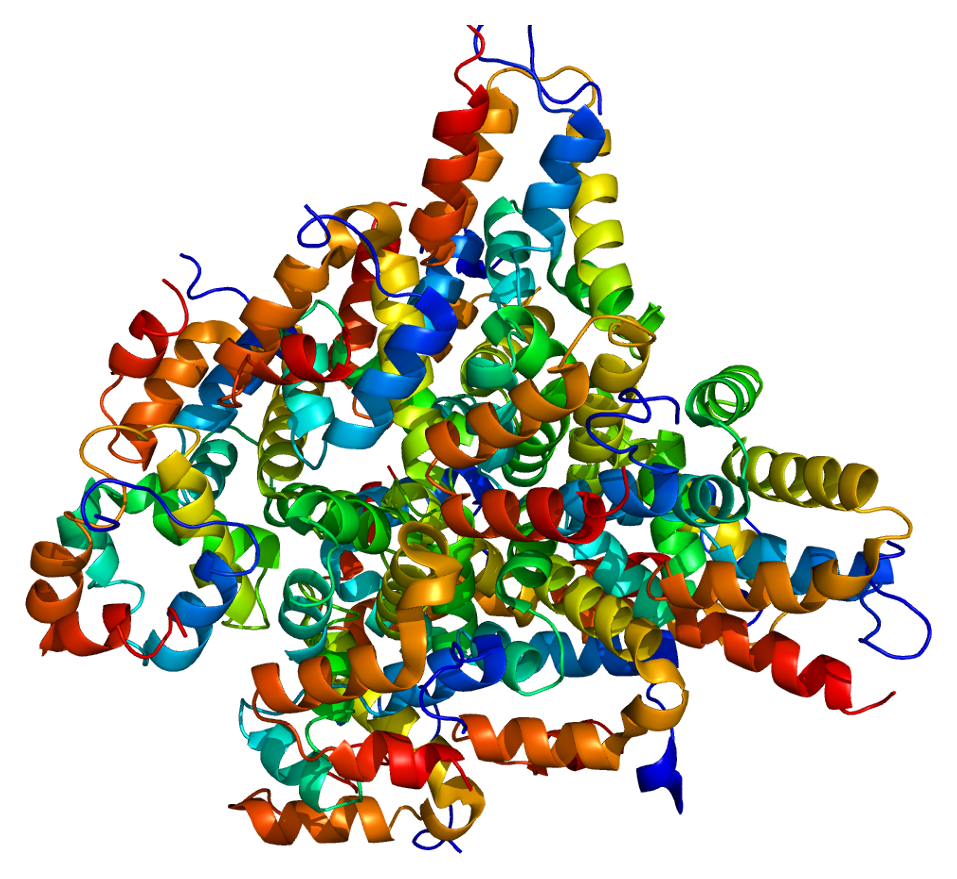

Identifiers
- Aliases: PIDD1, LRDD, PIDD, p53-induced death domain protein 1
- External IDs: OMIM: 605247; MGI: 1889507; GeneCards: PIDD1
Available structures
PDB	Ortholog search: PDBe RCSB
PDB	List of PDB id codes 2OF5

Gene location (Human)
Chr.	Chromosome 11 (human)
Band	11p15.5	Start	799,179 bp
Band	11p15.5	End	809,753 bp

Gene location (Mouse)
Chr.	Chromosome 7 (mouse)
Band	7|7 F5	Start	141,018,026 bp
Band	7|7 F5	End	141,023,938 bp
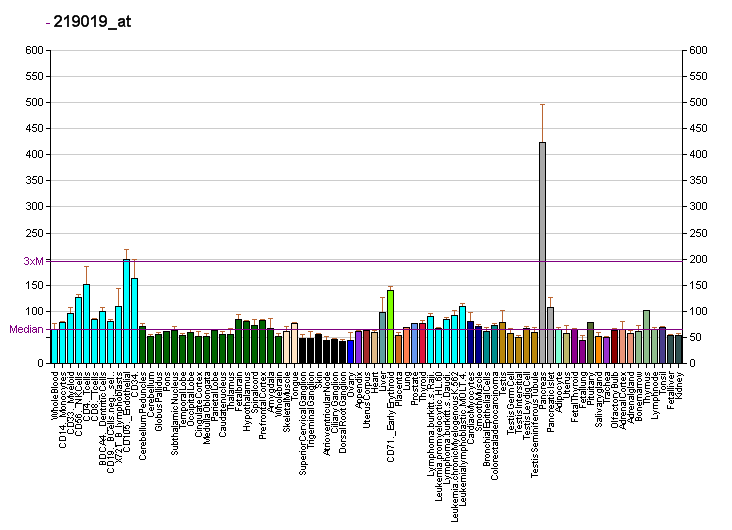

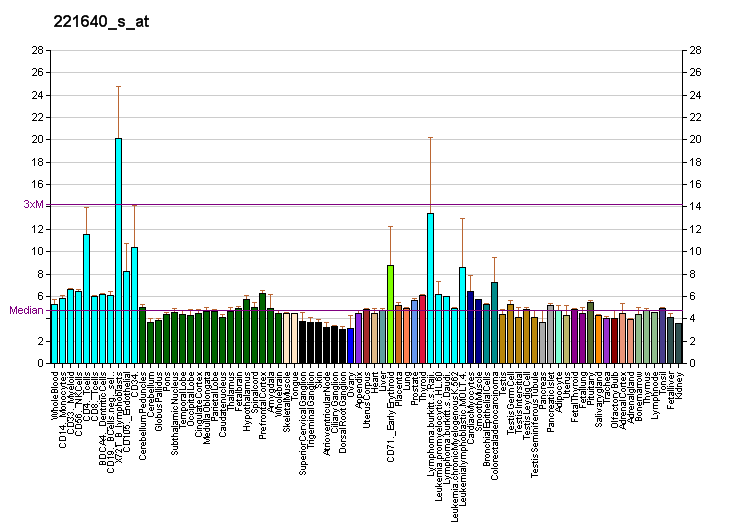
RNA expression pattern
Bgee	Human / Mouse (ortholog); Top expressed in: apex of heart; right hemisphere of cerebellum; right uterine tube; granulocyte; mucosa of transverse colon; C1 segment; right lobe of thyroid gland; anterior pituitary; left lobe of thyroid gland; skin of leg / Top expressed in: epithelium of nasopharynx; genital tubercle; fetal liver hematopoietic progenitor cell; tail of embryo; epiblast; ventricular zone; embryo; blastocyst; embryo; thymus; More reference expression data
BioGPS	More reference expression data
Gene ontology
Molecular function	death receptor binding; protein binding; volume-sensitive anion channel activity; endopeptidase activity; hydrolase activity
Cellular component	Golgi apparatus; nucleus; nucleoplasm; cytoplasm; cytosol; ion channel complex
Biological process	positive regulation of extrinsic apoptotic signaling pathway via death domain receptors; apoptotic process; positive regulation of extrinsic apoptotic signaling pathway; DNA damage response, signal transduction by p53 class mediator resulting in cell cycle arrest; negative regulation of apoptotic process; positive regulation of apoptotic signaling pathway; activation of cysteine-type endopeptidase activity involved in apoptotic process; positive regulation of NF-kappaB transcription factor activity; signal transduction; cellular response to DNA damage stimulus; positive regulation of apoptotic process; regulation of apoptotic process; inorganic anion transport; anion transmembrane transport; protein autoprocessing; regulation of I-kappaB kinase/NF-kappaB signaling; extrinsic apoptotic signaling pathway via death domain receptors; apoptotic signaling pathway; extrinsic apoptotic signaling pathway
Sources:Amigo / QuickGO
Orthologs
Databases	NCBI: entry; OMA: entry
Species	Human	Mouse
Entrez	55367	57913
Ensembl	ENSG00000177595	ENSMUSG00000025507
UniProt	Q9HB75	Q9ERV7
RefSeq (mRNA)	NM_018494; NM_145886; NM_145887	NM_022654; NM_001360523; NM_001360524
RefSeq (protein)	NP_665893; NP_665894	NP_073145; NP_001347452; NP_001347453
Location (UCSC)	Chr 11: 0.8 – 0.81 Mb	Chr 7: 141.02 – 141.02 Mb
PubMed search
- Wikidata
View/Edit Human	View/Edit Mouse

Leucine-rich repeats and death domain containing, also known as LRDD or p53-induced protein with a death domain (PIDD), is a protein which in humans is encoded by the LRDD gene.

The leucine-rich repeat (LRR), first identified by Patthy, is a domain involved in protein-protein interactions and is present in numerous proteins that serve a variety of cellular roles. Leucine-rich repeats (LRR) proteins in eukaryotic cells are found in the nucleus, cytoplasm, extracellular matrix and plasma membrane.

== The identification of PIDD1 ==
PIDD, now officially known as PIDD1 (p53-induced death domain protein 1), a transformation of name was necessary to avoid confusion with primary immune deficiency disorders, which are often abbreviated similarly in scientific literature. Notably, no PIDD1 orthologues have been identified in non-vertebrates, and PIDD1 paralogues have not been found in vertebrates. Initially, PIDD1 was also referred to as leucine-rich repeat and death domain containing protein (LRDD) and was independently reported by two research groups in 2000.

=== Death domain ===
Telliez and colleagues, in a bioinformatics search for proteins possessing a death domain that resembles the one found in human receptor-interacting serine/threonine kinase 1 (RIPK1, also known as RIP1), discovered a protein and named it LRDD based on its structural characteristics. Through sequence analysis, it was discovered to contain leucine-rich repeats (LRRs) at the N-terminal region, ZU5 domains (found in ZO-1 and Unc5-like netrin receptors) in the middle section, and a death domain (DD) at the C-terminus. Additionally, a structural domain referred to as the uncharacterized protein domain in UNC5, PIDD, and ankyrins (UPA) was also identified between the ZU5 domain and the death domain (DD).

=== Differential display analysis ===
Also, a differential display analysis conducted in an erythroleukaemia cell line by Lin and co-researchers discovered that PIDD1 is a direct transcriptional target of p53. Furthermore, PIDD1 overexpression inhibited cell growth by triggering apoptosis in p53-deficient cells, an effect that was reversed when PIDD1 was knocked down. This led to the assumption that PIDD1 plays a critical role in the apoptotic pathway regulated by p53. In p53-deficient HCT116 and HEK293 cells which express the large T antigen, a basal level of PIDD1 expression was observed. This finding suggests that PIDD1 may play roles beyond its traditional involvement in the p53-mediated DNA damage response.

== Structure of PIDD1 ==
=== Death fold ===
Proteins with a death domain (DD), such as PIDD1, are defined by a structural framework consisting of six α-helical bundles, referred to as a 'death fold'.

This structure is also present in other proteins that contain domains like the caspase recruitment domain (CARD), death effector domain (DED), pyrin domain (PYD), or combinations of these motifs (e.g., DD/CARD, DD/DED, PYRIN/CARD). These death folds facilitate homotypic protein-protein interactions (such as DD/DD or CARD/CARD), enabling the formation of large multi-protein signaling complexes. Notable examples include the apoptosome, which contains apoptotic protease-activating factor 1 (APAF1) and caspase-9, and the death-inducing signaling complex (DISC) associated with caspase-8 and members of the tumor necrosis factor receptor (TNFR) superfamily.

=== Parts and cleavages ===
Transcript variant 1 of PIDD1 mRNA in humans, produces a full-length PIDD1 protein consisting of 910 amino acids, with a molecular weight of about 100 kDa. This protein can be broken down into three parts: a 48 kDa N-terminal fragment called PIDD-N, and two C-terminal fragments, PIDD-C (51 kDa) and PIDD-CC (37 kDa). These cleavages occur at positions S446 and S588 through an autoproteolytic process that resembles proteins like inteins or nucleoporin Nup98 undergo self-cleavage. These proteins contain a conserved HSF tripeptide framework that enables a hydrophilic attack of the hydroxyl-group within the serine residue on the preceding peptide bond, converting it into an ester bond that is susceptible to cleavage by an additional nucleophile.

The cleavage of full-length PIDD1 (FL-PIDD1) into PIDD-C or PIDD-CC seems to occur constitutively, meaning it happens regularly, which makes FL-PIDD1 levels remain low even when p53 is activated. However, the observation that PIDD-C accumulates before PIDD-CC in response to DNA damage supports the idea that PIDD-C is the primary form generated from FL-PIDD1.

=== Role of chaperones ===
The autoprocessing of PIDD1 rate to induce the precise conformational state necessary for efficient self-cleavage. Hsp90 directly associates with full-length PIDD1 (FL-PIDD1), subsequently recruiting p23 to facilitate the stabilization and folding of PIDD1 into its active configuration. Hsp70, another key chaperone, binds not only to full-length PIDD1 (FL-PIDD1) but also to its cleavage fragments, PIDD-N and PIDD-C, although the specific role of this interaction is not yet fully understood. In addition to facilitating autoprocessing, Hsp90 plays a crucial role in maintaining PIDD1's stability and function, highlighting the importance of chaperones in controlling both PIDD1 self-cleavage and its overall protein levels. When Hsp90 is inhibited, PIDD1 undergoes rapid degradation through the E3 ubiquitin-protein ligase CHIP (also called STUB1), which appears to favor the ubiquitination of PIDD-C over PIDD-CC. CHIP directly interacts with both PIDD1 and Hsp70, suggesting that Hsp70 may also be involved in regulating PIDD1. Although the PIDDosome can form in vitro after temperature changes, and the dissociation of Hsp90 is required for this process, Hsp90s initial interaction is critical for PIDD1’s function. Interruption of the Hsp90-PIDD1 complex disrupts PIDD1 autoprocessing and its interactions with effector proteins.

== Multiprotein Complexes Containing PIDD1 ==
=== PIDDosome ===
PIDD-CC serves as a nucleating agent for the assembly of a complex with the dual adaptor protein RAIDD, which plays a pivotal role in the recruitment and activation of CASP2, potentially triggering apoptotic pathways. This assembly is widely recognized as the PIDDosome. In contrast, signaling pathways involving PIDD-C are primarily linked to the activation of NF-κB, thereby enhancing cell survival. In response to DNA damage, PIDD-C undergoes translocation to the nucleus, where it forms a complex with RIP1 and the NF-κB essential modulator (NEMO, also known as IKBKG), collectively termed the NEMO-PIDDosome. The term "PIDDosome" is commonly used to refer to a multiprotein complex that is made up of p53-induced death domain protein 1 (PIDD1), the bipartite linker protein CRADD (also known as RAIDD), and the inactive precursor of the caspase family endopeptidase, called caspase-2.

=== Caps-2-PIDDosome ===
Another important interaction is between Caspase-2 enzyme and PIDD1 to form Caps-2-PIDDosome. The formation of the Caspase–2–PIDDosome relies on the interaction with the adaptor protein RAIDD, which is characterized by the presence of a death domain (DD) and a caspase recruitment domain (CARD). RAIDD and PIDD-CC engage through their death domains (DD) to form a high molecular weight complex. Additionally, the N-terminal caspase recruitment domain (CARD) in RAIDD acts as a docking site for the zymogen of CASP2. This interaction is specifically associated with PIDD-CC, which is derived from the human PIDD1 transcript variant 1, since a small deletion in transcript variant 3 is likely sufficient to prevent RAIDD binding. The presence of PIDD-C in the nucleus is vital for the activation of NF-κB; however, PIDD-CC has also been detected in the nucleolus, an organelle that serves various functions, including ribosome biogenesis and DNA repair.

=== PCNA-PIDDosome ===
In addition to the signaling pathways previously discussed, PIDD1 is essential for translesion DNA synthesis (TLS), which allows for DNA extension across damaged regions in response to UV radiation. Within the nucleus, PIDD1 has been observed to associate with critical components of the replication machinery, such as proliferating cell nuclear antigen (PCNA) and replication factor C subunits RFC4 and RFC5, forming a complex referred to as the PCNA-PIDDosome. These proteins were identified as interacting partners of overexpressed PIDD1 through mass spectrometry analysis. PCNA functions as a DNA-sliding clamp that depends on replication factor C (RFC) for its correct positioning on DNA and is crucial for loading DNA polymerases during the replication process. Additionally, PCNA is essential for various DNA repair activities. Importantly, the interactions among PIDD1, PCNA, and RFC5 are facilitated by their ZU5 domains. As a result, this complex can only form with full-length PIDD1 or, due to the limited availability of full-length PIDD1 and the preferential nuclear localization of its primary autoprocessing product, with PIDD-C.

=== Relation of PIDD1 to centrosomes ===
Recent investigations reveal that CASP2 activation, which is dependent on PIDD1, does not lead to cell death or activate p53 in reaction to DNA damage (such as that induced by doxorubicin) or during prolonged mitotic arrest (as observed with taxol treatment). In contrast, the p53 activation linked to centrosome amplification—a process that can occur following failed cytokinesis—undoubtedly depends on the Caspase-2−PIDDosome complex. Notably, PIDD1 appears to be integral in assessing the quantity of mature mother centrioles, utilizing a mechanism that has yet to be fully clarified. Furthermore, PIDD1 is situated at the distal ends of mature centrosomes within normal cells, suggesting its potential role in regulating centrosomal functions. The assembly of the Caspase-2−PIDDosome can be triggered by the presence of multiple mature centrioles with appendages. This activation leads to CASP2-mediated cleavage of MDM2, resulting in the accumulation of p53 and subsequent cell cycle arrest mediated by p21. Notably, these processes occur without causing significant cell death. Similarly, the depletion of centrosomes undermines the effectiveness of this pathway during instances of cytokinesis failure. In contrast, overexpressing polo-like kinase 4 (PLK4), which promotes the formation of additional centrosomes, is sufficient to activate the pathway even when cytokinesis is not compromised.

== Function ==
The protein encoded by this gene contains a leucine-rich repeat and a death domain. This protein has been shown to interact with other death domain proteins, such as Fas (TNFRSF6)-associated via death domain (FADD) and MAP-kinase activating death domain-containing protein (MADD), and thus may function as an adaptor protein in cell death-related signaling processes. The expression of the mouse counterpart of this gene has been found to be positively regulated by the tumor suppressor p53 and to induce cell apoptosis in response to DNA damage, which suggests a role for this gene as an effector of p53-dependent apoptosis. Three alternatively spliced transcript variants encoding distinct isoforms have been reported.

Besides its pro-apoptotic function it may also be involved in DNA repair as part of a protein complex formed together with the catalytic subunit of DNA-PK (DNA-PKcs) and caspase 2. Signaling pathways involving PIDD-C have been associated with the activation of NF-κB and the promotion of cell survival. Following DNA damage, PIDD-C relocates to the nucleus, where it forms a complex with RIP1 and the NF-kappa-B inhibitor kinase subunit gamma (NEMO, or IKBKG), collectively referred to as the 'NEMO-PIDDosome.'

PIDD1 is also essential for translesion DNA synthesis (TLS), which enables DNA elongation across lesions in response to UV exposure. Inside the nucleus, PIDD1 forms a complex with critical replication machinery components, including proliferating cell nuclear antigen (PCNA), replication factor C subunit 5 (RFC5), and RFC4, known collectively as the PCNA-PIDDosome. These proteins were identified as binding partners of overexpressed PIDD1 through mass spectrometry analysis. PCNA functions as a DNA sliding clamp that requires RFC for its correct placement on the DNA and is crucial for loading DNA polymerases during the replication process.

Moreover, the activation of p53, which occurs in response to centrosome amplification—commonly resulting from failed cytokinesis—clearly relies on the Caspase-2−PIDDosome. Notably, PIDD1 seems to check the number of mature mother centrioles, though the specific mechanism by which it does so remains to be understood. Additionally, PIDD1 localizes to the distal end of mature centrosomes in healthy cells, indicating a possible role in centrosome function or stability.

== Caspase-2-PIDDosome ==
Caspases are a family of cysteine proteases that play key roles in regulating apoptosis and inflammatory responses. These enzymes are divided into two main groups: initiator and executioner caspases, based on their structure and function. Initiator caspases, such as caspase-8 and caspase-9, become activated through the formation of large protein complexes, which promote dimerization and self-cleavage. Once activated, they initiate the activation of effector caspases, like caspase-3 and caspase-7, which then execute the final stages of programmed cell death. Caspase-2 has similar structure to the initiator caspase-9, particularly due to the presence of a caspase activation and recruitment domain (CARD). Its activation mechanism also involves dimerization, followed by autoprocessing, which is essential for its full activation. Similar to caspase-9 and its role within the apoptosome, the multiprotein complex that facilitates caspase-2 activation has been designated as the "PIDDosome" (Caspase-2-PIDDosome). This structure is formed by the C-terminal fragment of PIDD1 (p53-induced death domain protein 1) and RAIDD (receptor-interacting protein-associated ICH-1/CED-3 homolog with a death domain, also known as CRADD) in a 5:5 stoichiometric ratio. Two additional RAIDD molecules are positioned on top of the core complex, completing its assembly. RAIDD functions as a dual adaptor protein, featuring specialized domains that facilitate key interactions. The C-terminal death domain (DD) of RAIDD interacts with the corresponding DD of PIDD1, while the N-terminal region contains a caspase activation and recruitment domain (CARD) that promotes homotypic binding with procaspase-2. This configuration enables RAIDD to play a critical role in the signaling pathways that lead to apoptosis. The binding of procaspase-2 to the complex positions the caspase-2 monomers in close proximity, which promotes their dimerization and initiates autocatalytic cleavage, resulting in activation. In addition to DNA damage, several other factors have been identified as potential triggers for caspase-2 activation, both within and outside the PIDDosome. These activation signals are varied and encompass conditions such as heat shock, alterations to the cytoskeleton, and the buildup of β-amyloids. Importantly, caspase-2 and the PIDDosome play essential role in "polyploidy checkpoint." Importantly, caspase-2 and the PIDDosome play essential role in "polyploidy checkpoint." Triggered by the presence of extra centrosomes (supernumeray centrosomes), which often occur following unsuccessful cell division (cytokinesis), the PIDDosome activates caspase-2. This activation leads to the proteolytic inactivation of MDM2, resulting in the activation of a p53 response. Additionally, recent research has connected caspase-2 to the monitoring of aneuploidy in cancer, although the exact mechanisms involved are not yet clearly defined.

== PIDD1 and Cancer ==
Tumor protein p53 (TP53, often referred to as p53) regulates a sophisticated network of tumor-suppressive responses to prevent the growth and persistence of cells with extra centrosomes. These responses include halting cell division, promoting cellular senescence, initiating controlled cell death, and, in instances of whole-genome duplication, activating immune surveillance by cytotoxic T cells. CASP2 plays a very important role in regulation and activation of p53 in response to extra centrosomes. Its activation is dependent on the formation of the "PIDDosome," a large protein complex that includes p53-induced death domain protein 1 (PIDD1), CASP2, and RIPK1 containing a death domain (CRADD, commonly referred to as RAIDD). This complex enables CASP2 to inactivate MDM2, a key inhibitor of p53, thereby promoting the activation of p53. In a study, Evans and colleagues conducted a genome-wide CRISPR-Cas9 knockout screen using immortalized retinal pigment epithelial cells (hTERT RPE-1), modified to overexpress PLK4, which induces centriole overduplication. The cells also had constant depletion of ubiquitin-specific peptidase 28 (USP28) and tripartite motif-containing 37 (TRIM37), in order to suppress pathways typically activated by centrosome loss. This screening identified 30 genes involved in halting the proliferation of hTERT RPE-1 cells with excess centrosomes (supetnumerary centrosomes), with 23 of these genes previously linked to centrosome-related functions. These genes encode a variety of well established PIDDosome components and significant signaling proteins, including PIDD1, CRADD, CASP2, p53, and cyclin-dependent kinase inhibitor 1A (CDKN1A, often referred to as p21). They also encompass four proteins not previously associated with PIDDosome signaling: centrosomal protein 20 (CEP20, also known as FOPNL), C2 domain-containing protein 3 (C2CD3), which is involved in centriole elongation, sodium channel and clathrin linker 1 (SCLT1), and ankyrin repeat domain 26 (ANKRD26). The ability of these proteins to inhibit the proliferation of cells overexpressing PLK4 was confirmed through competition assays, underscoring their important functions in cell cycle regulation. Inadequate centrosome clustering resulted in a reduced activation of the PIDDosome, as shown by diminished CASP2 activation and lower p21 levels in RPE-1 cells with PLK4 overexpression and absent ANKRD26. Further experiments, involving both ANKRD26-competent and -deficient RPE-1 cells along with various full-length proteins, mutants lacking specific domains, and non-cleavable variants, demonstrated that PIDD1's recruitment to centrioles is mediated by the interaction between the acidic region of ANKRD26 and the UPA domain of the C-terminal part of PIDD1 (PIDD1-CC), which arises from PIDD1's autoproteolytic processing. Importantly, in the context of inducible PLK4, this interaction was critical for the activation of the PIDDosome and the resulting cell cycle arrest. Furthermore, a study examining 20 different human tumors uncovered a recurrent mutation in ANKRD26 that adversely affects the interaction between ANKRD26 and PIDD1 with centrosomes, thereby increasing the survival of cells with more than required number of centrosomes. The process of centrosome accumulation initiates a signaling pathway characterized by the involvement of Caspase-2 and the PIDDosome, which collectively contribute to the stabilization of p53 and the induction of p21 expression. This series of events can lead to an increase in PIDD1 levels over time, as it is also a downstream target of p53. The observed rise in PIDD1 expression is likely a result of subsequent DNA damage occurring in cells that fail to effectively arrest their cell cycle in the presence of excess centrosomes. Consequently, this situation may activate p53 through either the conventional DNA damage response mechanism or as a result of delayed M-phase progression caused by complications in chromosome alignment. This mechanism guarantees the effective operation of the p21 checkpoint, which, in turn, promotes the viability of aneuploid cells. At the same time, a lack of CASP2 intensifies tumor advancement in this cancer model following treatment with cisplatin, leading to an accelerated progression of the malignancy. PIDDosome-deficient animals provide an intriguing model for exploring the effects of ploidy on liver function and regenerative processes, avoiding the complications that arise from a global deficiency of p53. It is noteworthy that several cell types become polyploid during organ development or in response to infections. For example, cardiomyocytes enhance their ploidy during terminal differentiation, while viral infections can induce cell fusion, and bacterial infections may lead to the formation of multinucleated giant cells in macrophages. Reflecting on the previous discussions, it is plausible to propose that PIDD1 might be activated in certain circumstances, which positions it as a promising candidate for pharmacological strategies aimed at influencing these processes.

=== Recent Interests on PIDD1 ===
Over the past few years, biallelic pathogenic variants in the CRADD gene have been strongly associated with a rare neurodevelopmental disorder (MRT34; MIM 614499), known as the "thin" lissencephaly (TLIS) variant. This disorder is characterized by pachygyria, primarily affecting the anterior regions of the brain, and is accompanied by megalencephaly, epilepsy, and intellectual disability (ID). This discovery has drawn increased attention to the PIDDosome complex, revealing a wider array of biological functions beyond its conventional role in apoptosis triggered by DNA damage. In this regard, PIDD1, a CRADD-interacting protein, functions as a sensor that monitors centrosome numbers and plays a vital role in controlling cellular differentiation during key processes such as organogenesis and tissue regeneration. Recently, four homozygous variants in the PIDD1 gene have been identified among 11 individuals from five separate families, all of whom present with nonsyndromic intellectual disability. Nevertheless, comprehensive clinical and neuroimaging data for these cases are limited.
