= APIP =

Protein-coding gene in the species Homo sapiens

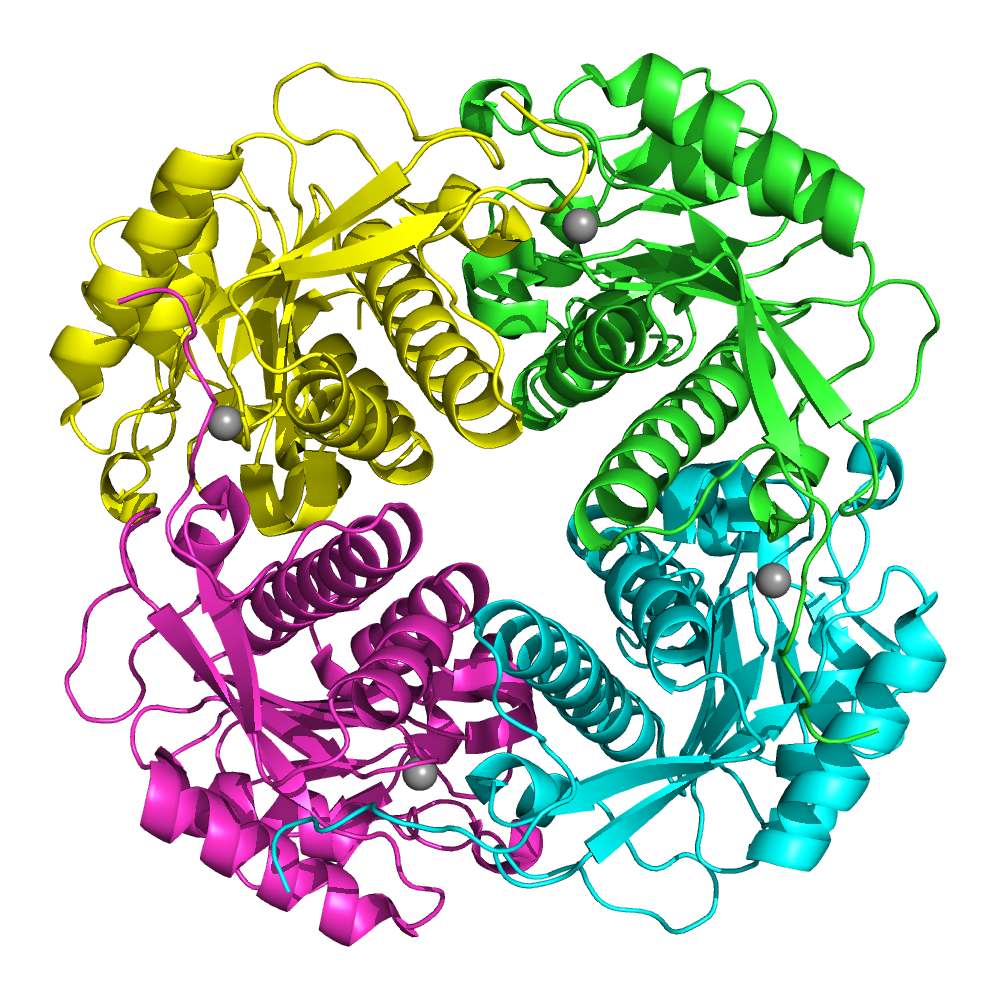

Identifiers
- Aliases: APIP, APIP2, CGI29, MMRP19, hCGI-29, APAF1 interacting protein
- External IDs: OMIM: 612491; MGI: 1926788; GeneCards: APIP
Available structures
PDB	Ortholog search: PDBe RCSB
PDB	List of PDB id codes 4M6R
Enzyme activity
EC #	BRENDA	ExPASy	KEGG	MetaCyc
4.2.1.109	↗	↗	↗	↗

Gene location (Human)
Chr.	Chromosome 11 (human)
Band	11p13	Start	34,853,094 bp
Band	11p13	End	34,916,379 bp

Gene location (Mouse)
Chr.	Chromosome 2 (mouse)
Band	2|2 E2	Start	102,904,020 bp
Band	2|2 E2	End	102,922,989 bp
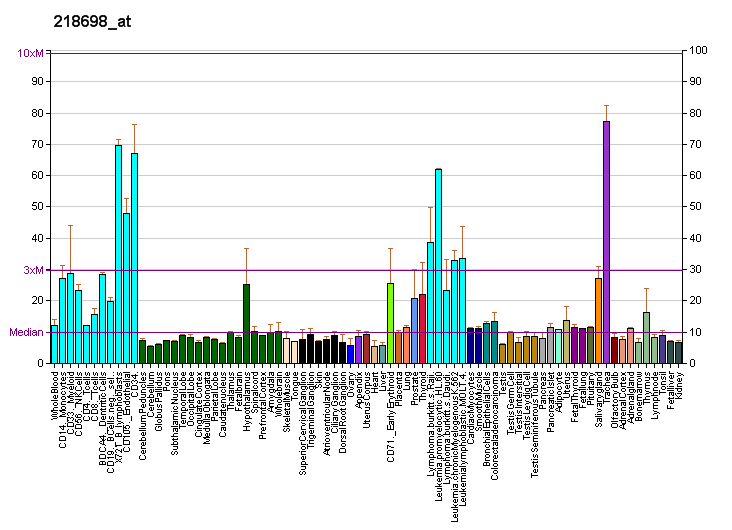
RNA expression pattern
Bgee	Human / Mouse (ortholog); Top expressed in: C1 segment; muscle of thigh; right adrenal gland; corpus callosum; right adrenal cortex; monocyte; skeletal muscle tissue; left adrenal gland; left adrenal cortex; gastrocnemius muscle / Top expressed in: right ventricle; interventricular septum; zygote; cardiac muscle tissue of left ventricle; muscle of thigh; secondary oocyte; right kidney; digastric muscle; temporal muscle; brown adipose tissue; More reference expression data
BioGPS	More reference expression data
Gene ontology
Molecular function	protein binding; metal ion binding; lyase activity; identical protein binding; methylthioribulose 1-phosphate dehydratase activity; zinc ion binding
Cellular component	cytoplasm; cytosol
Biological process	methionine biosynthetic process; negative regulation of apoptotic process; cellular amino acid biosynthetic process; regulation of ERK1 and ERK2 cascade; apoptotic process; pyroptosis; protein homotetramerization; L-methionine salvage from methylthioadenosine; L-methionine salvage from S-adenosylmethionine
Sources:Amigo / QuickGO
Orthologs
Databases	NCBI: entry; OMA: entry
Species	Human	Mouse
Entrez	51074	56369
Ensembl	ENSG00000149089	ENSMUSG00000010911
UniProt	Q96GX9	Q9WVQ5
RefSeq (mRNA)	NM_015957	NM_019735; NM_001355473; NM_001355474
RefSeq (protein)	NP_057041	NP_062709; NP_001342402; NP_001342403
Location (UCSC)	Chr 11: 34.85 – 34.92 Mb	Chr 2: 102.9 – 102.92 Mb
PubMed search
- Wikidata
View/Edit Human	View/Edit Mouse

APAF1-interacting protein is a protein that in humans is encoded by the APIP gene. It is an enzyme with Methylthioribulose 1-phosphate dehydratase activity which is involved in the methionine salvage pathway.

APIP deficiency is associated with cell death and cancer.

== Interactions ==
APIP has been shown to interact with APAF1.
