= Caspase-10 =

Enzyme

Identifiers
- EC no.: 3.4.22.63
- CAS no.: 189088-85-5

Databases
- IntEnz: IntEnz view
- BRENDA: BRENDA entry
- ExPASy: NiceZyme view
- KEGG: KEGG entry
- MetaCyc: metabolic pathway
- PRIAM: profile
- PDB structures: RCSB PDB PDBe PDBsum
Search
- PMC: articles
- PubMed: articles
- NCBI: proteins

Caspase-10 (EC 3.4.22.63, FLICE2, Mch4, CASP-10, ICE-like apoptotic protease 4, apoptotic protease Mch-4, FAS-associated death domain protein interleukin-1beta-converting enzyme 2) is an enzyme. This enzyme catalyses the following chemical reaction

Strict requirement for Asp at position P1 and has a preferred cleavage sequence of Leu-Gln-Thr-Asp!Gly

Caspase-10 is an initiator caspase, as are caspase-2 (EC 3.4.22.55), caspase-8 (EC 3.4.22.61) and caspase-9 (EC 3.4.22.62).
