= EI24 =

Protein-coding gene in the species Homo sapiens

Identifiers
- Aliases: EI24, EPG4, PIG8, TP53I8, autophagy associated transmembrane protein, EI24 autophagy associated transmembrane protein
- External IDs: OMIM: 605170; MGI: 108090; HomoloGene: 3588; GeneCards: EI24; OMA:EI24 - orthologs

Gene location (Human)
Chr.	Chromosome 11 (human)
Band	11q24.2	Start	125,569,280 bp
Band	11q24.2	End	125,584,684 bp

Gene location (Mouse)
Chr.	Chromosome 9 (mouse)
Band	9 A4|9 20.68 cM	Start	36,690,455 bp
Band	9 A4|9 20.68 cM	End	36,708,689 bp
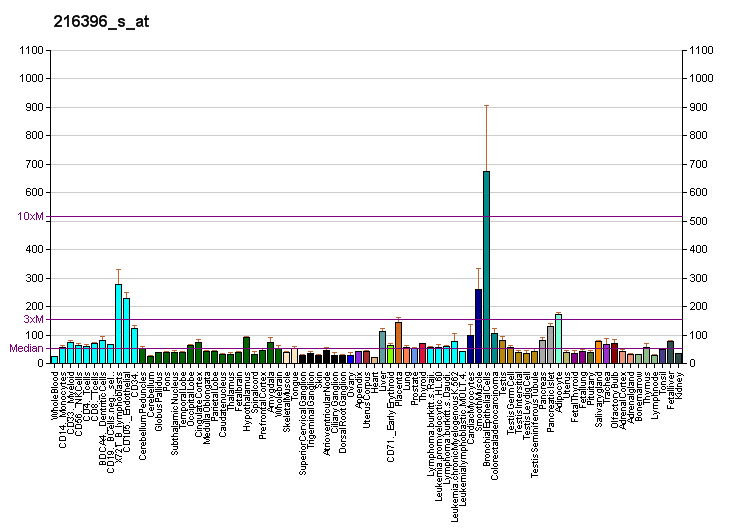
RNA expression pattern
Bgee	Human / Mouse (ortholog); Top expressed in: secondary oocyte; right lobe of liver; body of pancreas; islet of Langerhans; rectum; gastrocnemius muscle; stromal cell of endometrium; muscle of thigh; mucosa of esophagus; skin of leg / Top expressed in: transitional epithelium of urinary bladder; Ileal epithelium; medullary collecting duct; left lobe of liver; renal corpuscle; lacrimal gland; trigeminal ganglion; conjunctival fornix; medial ganglionic eminence; condyle; More reference expression data
BioGPS	More reference expression data
Orthologs
Species	Human	Mouse
Entrez	9538	13663
Ensembl	ENSG00000149547	ENSMUSG00000062762
UniProt	O14681	Q61070
RefSeq (mRNA)	NM_001007277; NM_001290135; NM_004879; NM_001330419	NM_001199494; NM_007915
RefSeq (protein)	NP_001277064; NP_001317348; NP_004870	NP_001186423; NP_031941
Location (UCSC)	Chr 11: 125.57 – 125.58 Mb	Chr 9: 36.69 – 36.71 Mb
PubMed search
- Wikidata
View/Edit Human	View/Edit Mouse

Etoposide-induced protein 2.4 homolog is a protein that in humans is encoded by the EI24 gene.

This gene has higher expression in p53-expressing cells than in control cells and is an immediate-early induction target of p53-mediated apoptosis. The protein encoded by this gene contains six putative transmembrane domains and may suppress cell growth by inducing apoptotic cell death through the caspase 9 and mitochondrial pathways. This gene is located on human chromosome 11q24, a region frequently altered in cancers. Alternative splicing results in two transcript variants encoding different isoforms.
