= Caspase 2 =

Enzyme found in humans

CASP2
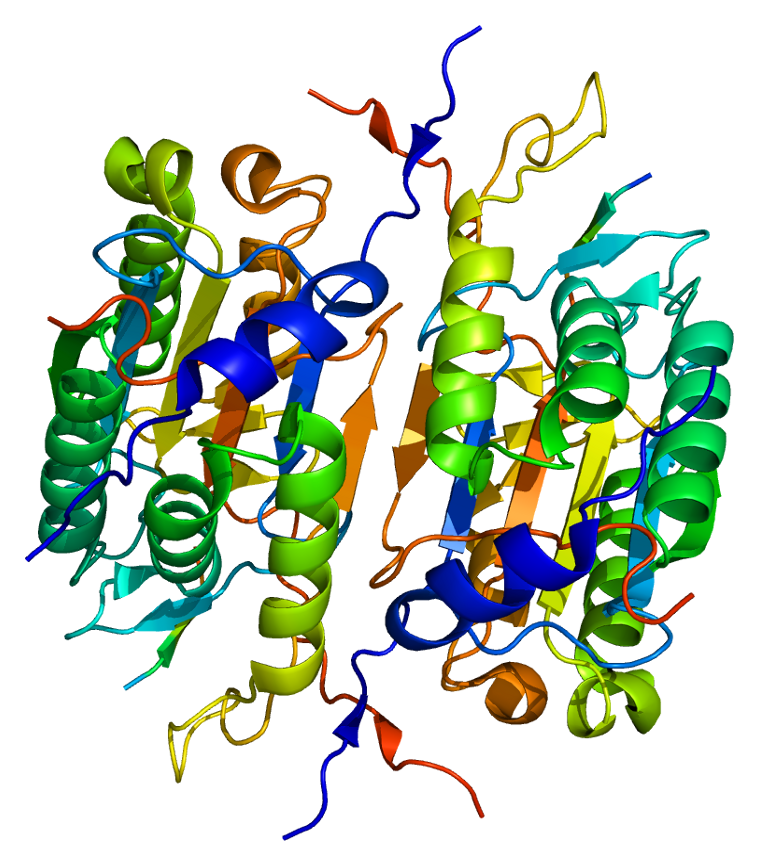

Identifiers
- Aliases: CASP2, CASP-2, ICH1, NEDD-2, NEDD2, PPP1R57, caspase 2
- External IDs: OMIM: 600639; MGI: 97295; GeneCards: CASP2
Available structures
| PDB | Ortholog search: PDBe RCSB |
| PDB | List of PDB id codes 1PYO, 2P2C, 3R5J, 3R6G, 3R6L, 3R7B, 3R7N, 3R7S, 3RJM |
Enzyme activity
| EC # | BRENDA | ExPASy | KEGG | MetaCyc |
|---|---|---|---|---|
| 3.4.22.55 | ↗ | ↗ | ↗ | ↗ |

Gene location (Human)
| Chr. | Chromosome 7 (human) |
| Band | 7q34 | Start | 143,288,215 bp |
| Band | 7q34 | End | 143,307,696 bp |

Gene location (Mouse)
| Chr. | Chromosome 6 (mouse) |
| Band | 6 B2.1|6 20.54 cM | Start | 42,241,919 bp |
| Band | 6 B2.1|6 20.54 cM | End | 42,259,442 bp |
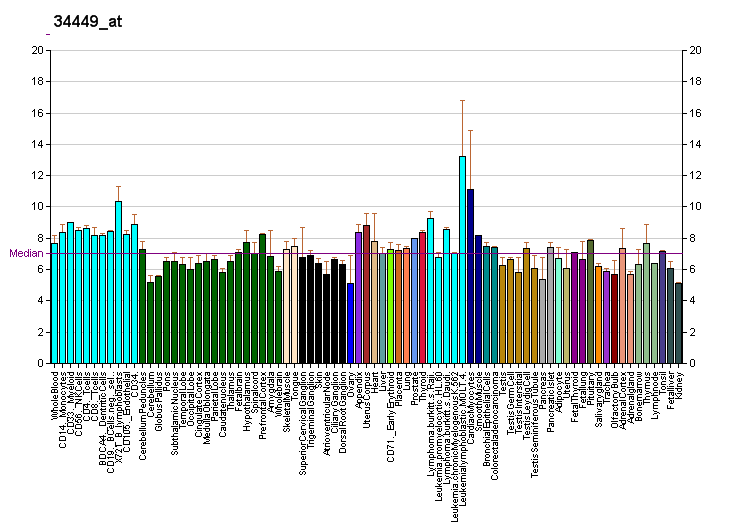

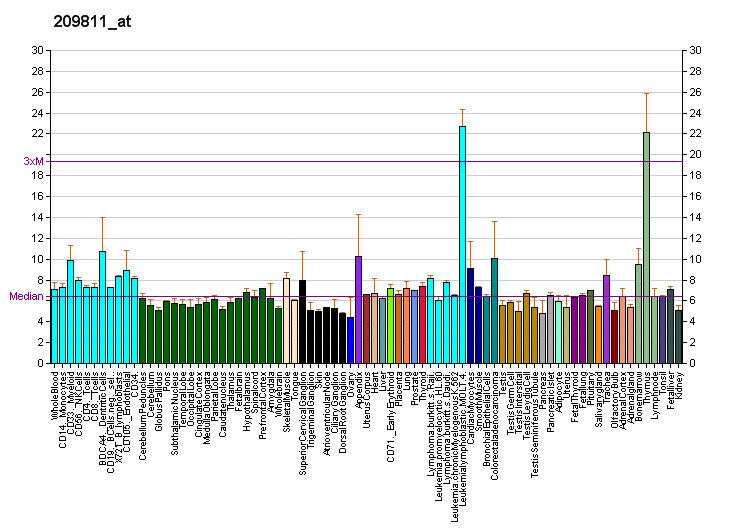

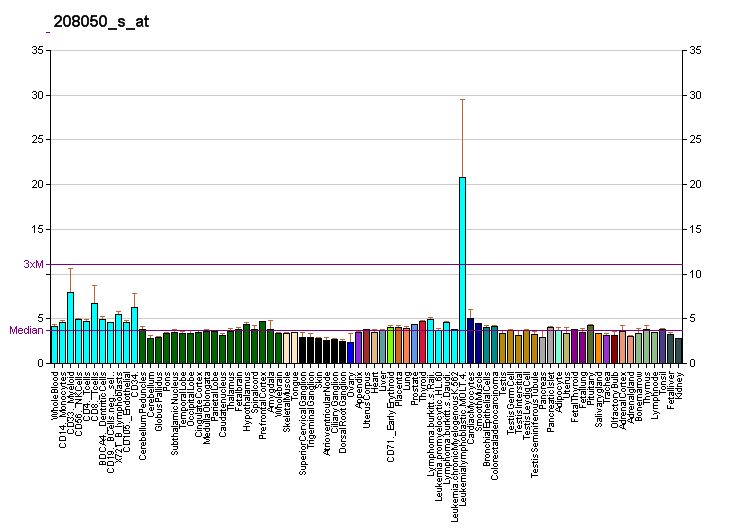
RNA expression pattern
| Bgee | Human / Mouse (ortholog); Top expressed in: buccal mucosa cell; tendon of biceps brachii; trabecular bone; skin of hip; skin of thigh; tonsil; ganglionic eminence; blood; mucosa of sigmoid colon; testicle / Top expressed in: saccule; otic placode; otic vesicle; endocardial cushion; fetal liver hematopoietic progenitor cell; maxillary prominence; mandibular prominence; thymus; hair follicle; Gonadal ridge; More reference expression data |
| BioGPS | More reference expression data |
Gene ontology
| Molecular function | cysteine-type peptidase activity; protein domain specific binding; peptidase activity; protein binding; enzyme binding; hydrolase activity; identical protein binding; cysteine-type endopeptidase activity involved in apoptotic process; cysteine-type endopeptidase activity; cysteine-type endopeptidase activity involved in execution phase of apoptosis |
| Cellular component | cytoplasm; cytosol; membrane; mitochondrion; nucleus |
| Biological process | DNA damage response, signal transduction by p53 class mediator resulting in cell cycle arrest; execution phase of apoptosis; protein processing; ageing; positive regulation of apoptotic signaling pathway; luteolysis; cellular response to mechanical stimulus; positive regulation of neuron apoptotic process; brain development; intrinsic apoptotic signaling pathway in response to DNA damage; extrinsic apoptotic signaling pathway in absence of ligand; positive regulation of apoptotic process; ectopic germ cell programmed cell death; apoptotic signaling pathway; neural retina development; apoptotic process; regulation of apoptotic process; proteolysis; negative regulation of apoptotic process |
Sources:Amigo / QuickGO
Orthologs
| Databases | NCBI: entry; OMA: entry |
| Species | Human | Mouse |
| Entrez | 835 | 12366 |
| Ensembl | ENSG00000106144 | ENSMUSG00000029863 |
| UniProt | P42575 | P29594 |
| RefSeq (mRNA) | NM_032983; NM_001224; NM_032982; NM_032984 | NM_007610 |
| RefSeq (protein) | NP_001215; NP_116764; NP_116765 | NP_031636 |
| Location (UCSC) | Chr 7: 143.29 – 143.31 Mb | Chr 6: 42.24 – 42.26 Mb |
| PubMed search |
- Wikidata
| View/Edit Human | View/Edit Mouse |

Caspase-2

Identifiers
- EC no.: 3.4.22.55
- CAS no.: 182372-14-1

Databases
- BRENDA: enzyme data
- ExPASy: NiceZyme view
- KEGG: enzyme entry
- MetaCyc: metabolic pathway
- Rhea: reactions
- PDB structures: RCSB PDB PDBe PDBsum
Search
- PMC: articles
- PubMed: articles
- NCBI: proteins

Caspase 2 (EC 3.4.22.55), also known as ICH-1, NEDD-2, caspase-2L, caspase-2S, neural precursor cell expressed developmentally down-regulated protein 2, CASP-2, or NEDD2 protein, is an enzyme that, in humans, is encoded by the CASP2 gene. CASP2 orthologs have been identified in nearly all mammals for which complete genome data are available. Unique orthologs are also present in birds, lizards, lissamphibians, and teleosts.

== Function ==
Caspase-2 is an initiator caspase, as are caspase-8 (EC 3.4.22.61), caspase-9 (EC 3.4.22.62) and caspase-10 (EC 3.4.22.63).

Sequential activation of caspases plays a central role in the execution-phase of cell apoptosis. Caspases exist as inactive proenzymes that undergo proteolytic processing at conserved aspartic residues to produce two subunits, large and small, that dimerize to form the active enzyme. The proteolytic cleavage of this protein is induced by a variety of apoptotic stimuli.

Caspase 2 proteolytically cleaves other proteins. It belongs to a family of cysteine proteases called caspases that cleave proteins only at an amino acid following an aspartic acid residue. Within this family, caspase 2 is part of the Ich-1 subfamily. It is one of the most conserved caspases in different species of animal. Caspase 2 has a similar amino acid sequence to initiator caspases, including caspase 1, caspase 4, caspase 5, and caspase 9. It is produced as a zymogen, which contains a long pro-domain that is similar to that of caspase 9 and contains a protein interaction domain known as a CARD domain. Pro-caspase-2 contains two subunits, p19 and p12.

It has been shown to associate with several proteins involved in apoptosis using its CARD domain, including RIP-associated Ich-1/Ced-3-homologue protein with a death domain (RAIDD), apoptosis repressor with caspase recruitment domain (ARC), and death effector filament-forming Ced-4-like apoptosis protein (DEFCAP). Together with RAIDD and p53-induced protein with a death domain ([PIDD])(LRDD), caspase 2 has been shown to form the so-called PIDDosome, which may serve as an activation platform for the protease, although it may also be activated in the absence of PIDD. Overall, caspase 2 appears to be a very versatile caspase with multiple functions beyond cell death induction.

Caspase-2 is an important enzyme in the cysteine aspartate protease family, known as caspases, which are central to the regulation of apoptosis and, in certain cases, inflammation. While many caspases are mainly involved in the initiation and execution of cell death, caspase-2 has a broader range of functions. Beyond its apoptotic role, it contributes to maintaining genomic stability and responding to cellular stress, demonstrating its multifaceted role in cellular processes and its wider importance in cell regulation mechanisms. When caspases are activated, they break down a variety of specific protein substrates, triggering the distinct features of apoptosis, such as DNA fragmentation, chromatin condensation, and plasma membrane blebbing. Caspase-2, known as the most evolutionarily conserved caspase, holds a unique role in both apoptotic and non-apoptotic functions. Its evolutionary stability highlights its essential contributions to cellular processes like preserving genomic integrity and regulating stress responses, demonstrating its broader significance beyond just apoptosis.

== Activation through dimerization ==
Caspases are classified into two fundamental groups: initiator caspases, including caspase-8 and caspase-9, and executioner caspases, such as caspase-3 and caspase-7, each playing distinct roles in the apoptosis signaling pathway. Initiator caspases serve as critical regulators at the top of various signaling cascades, orchestrating the activation of executioner caspases through both direct and indirect mechanisms. While these caspases are typically found as inactive monomers within the cell, their activation relies on dimerization. This dimerization occurs when initiator caspases are recruited to large protein complexes that function as intricate signaling platforms, enabling their conversion to an active form. Caspases are produced as single-chain pro-caspases that undergo cleavage within their chains, resulting in the formation of large and small catalytic subunits. Although this cleavage is both necessary and sufficient for activating executioner caspases, evidence indicates that initiator caspases require dimerization for activation. Furthermore, the intra-chain cleavage that follows this process helps to stabilize the active form of the enzyme. Caspase-2 is activated via a mechanism that parallels those of other caspases. In its monomeric state, it shows no measurable activity, regardless of its cleavage status. Conversely, a dimeric form of a cleavage-deficient mutant retains about 20% of its enzymatic activity. Following autoprocessing of the dimerized form, caspase-2 becomes fully active. Consequently, the first step in the activation of caspase-2 is dimerization.

== Interactions ==
Caspase 2 has been shown to interact with:

- BH3 interacting domain death agonist,
- CRADD, and
- Caspase 8.

== See also ==
- Neural precursor cell
- The Proteolysis Map
