= PIDD =

PIDD may refer to:

- p53-induced protein with a death domain, also known as LRDD,
- Primary Immune Deficiency Disease
