= CRADD =

Protein-coding gene in humans

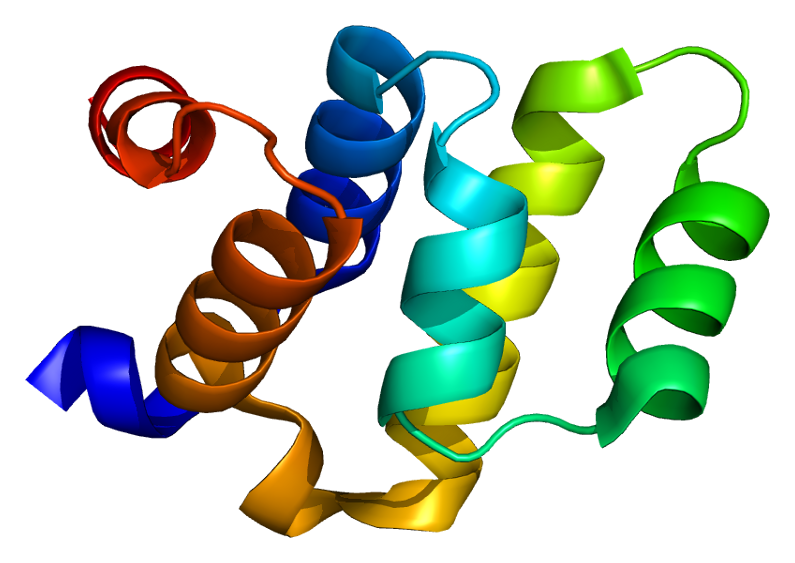

Identifiers
- Aliases: CRADD, MRT34, RAIDD, CASP2 and RIPK1 domain containing adaptor with death domain
- External IDs: OMIM: 603454; MGI: 1336168; GeneCards: CRADD
Available structures
PDB	Ortholog search: PDBe RCSB
PDB	List of PDB id codes 2O71, 2OF5, 3CRD

Gene location (Human)
Chr.	Chromosome 12 (human)
Band	12q22	Start	93,677,375 bp
Band	12q22	End	93,894,840 bp

Gene location (Mouse)
Chr.	Chromosome 10 (mouse)
Band	10 C2|10 49.26 cM	Start	95,010,608 bp
Band	10 C2|10 49.26 cM	End	95,159,995 bp
RNA expression pattern
Bgee	Human / Mouse (ortholog); Top expressed in: testicle; left ventricle; right lobe of liver; apex of heart; gonad; islet of Langerhans; right auricle of heart; right testis; left testis; left adrenal gland / Top expressed in: granulocyte; genital tubercle; muscle of thigh; right kidney; proximal tubule; tail of embryo; Ileal epithelium; cardiac muscle tissue of left ventricle; medial ganglionic eminence; embryo; More reference expression data
BioGPS	n/a
Gene ontology
Molecular function	protein-macromolecule adaptor activity; protein binding; protease binding; death domain binding
Cellular component	cytoplasm; nucleus; cytosol
Biological process	cellular response to mechanical stimulus; DNA damage response, signal transduction by p53 class mediator resulting in cell cycle arrest; positive regulation of apoptotic signaling pathway; activation of cysteine-type endopeptidase activity involved in apoptotic process; extrinsic apoptotic signaling pathway via death domain receptors; signal transduction; apoptotic process; regulation of apoptotic process; positive regulation of apoptotic process; apoptotic signaling pathway
Sources:Amigo / QuickGO
Orthologs
Databases	NCBI: entry; OMA: entry
Species	Human	Mouse
Entrez	8738	12905
Ensembl	ENSG00000169372	ENSMUSG00000045867
UniProt	P78560; Q8IY43	O88843
RefSeq (mRNA)	NM_003805; NM_001320099; NM_001320100; NM_001320101; NM_001330126	NM_009950; NM_001330138; NM_001330141; NM_001330175
RefSeq (protein)	NP_001307028; NP_001307029; NP_001307030; NP_001317055; NP_003796 NP_001307028.1	NP_001317067; NP_001317070; NP_001317104; NP_034080
Location (UCSC)	Chr 12: 93.68 – 93.89 Mb	Chr 10: 95.01 – 95.16 Mb
PubMed search
- Wikidata
View/Edit Human	View/Edit Mouse

Death domain-containing protein CRADD is a protein that in humans is encoded by the CRADD gene.

== Function ==
The protein encoded by this gene is a death domain (CARD/DD)-containing protein and has been shown to induce cell apoptosis. Through its CARD domain, this protein interacts with, and thus recruits, caspase 2/ICH1 to the cell death signal transduction complex that includes tumor necrosis factor receptor 1 (TNFR1A), RIPK1/RIP kinase, and numbers of other CARD domain-containing proteins.

== Interactions ==
CRADD has been shown to interact with RIPK1 and Caspase 2.
