= Methylthioribulose 1-phosphate dehydratase =

methylthioribulose 1-phosphate dehydratase
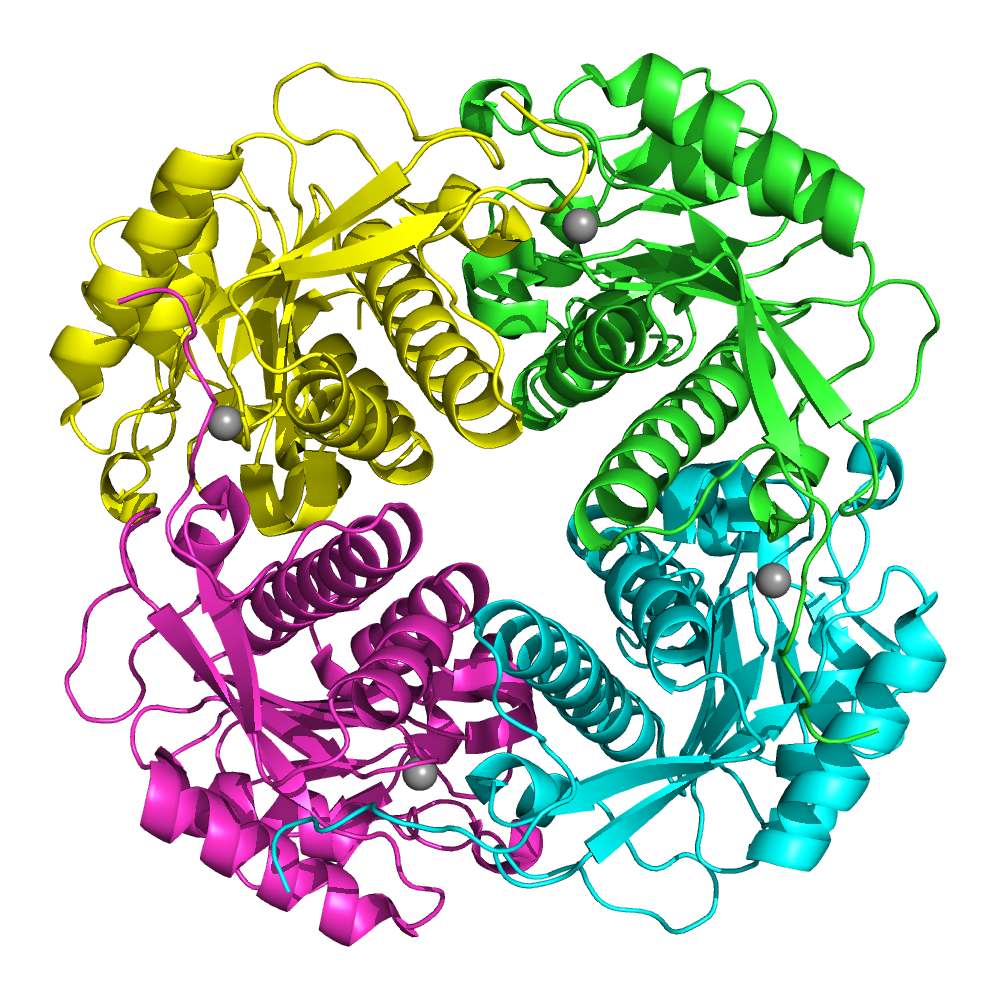
- X-ray structure of human methylthioribulose 1-phosphate dehydratase (APIP). PDB entry 4m6r

Identifiers
- EC no.: 4.2.1.109

Databases
- IntEnz: IntEnz view
- BRENDA: BRENDA entry
- ExPASy: NiceZyme view
- KEGG: KEGG entry
- MetaCyc: metabolic pathway
- PRIAM: profile
- PDB structures: RCSB PDB PDBe PDBsum
- Gene Ontology: AmiGO / QuickGO
Search
- PMC: articles
- PubMed: articles
- NCBI: proteins

The enzyme methylthioribulose 1-phosphate dehydratase (EC .2.1.109) catalyzes the chemical reaction

5-(methylsulfanyl)-D)ribulose 1-phosphate $\rightleftharpoons$ 5-(methylthio)-2,3-dioxopentyl phosphate + H_{2}

This enzyme belongs to the family of lyases, specifically the hydro-lyases, which cleave carbon-oxygen bonds. The systematic name of this enzyme class is 5-methyl-5-thio-D-ribulose-1-phosphate 4-hydro-lyase [5-(methylthio)-2,3-dioxopentyl-phosphate-forming]. Other names in common use include 1-PMT-ribulose dehydratase, and S-methyl-5-thio-D-ribulose-1-phosphate hydro-lyase. This enzyme participates in methionine metabolism.
