= APAF1 =

Mammalian protein found in Homo sapiens

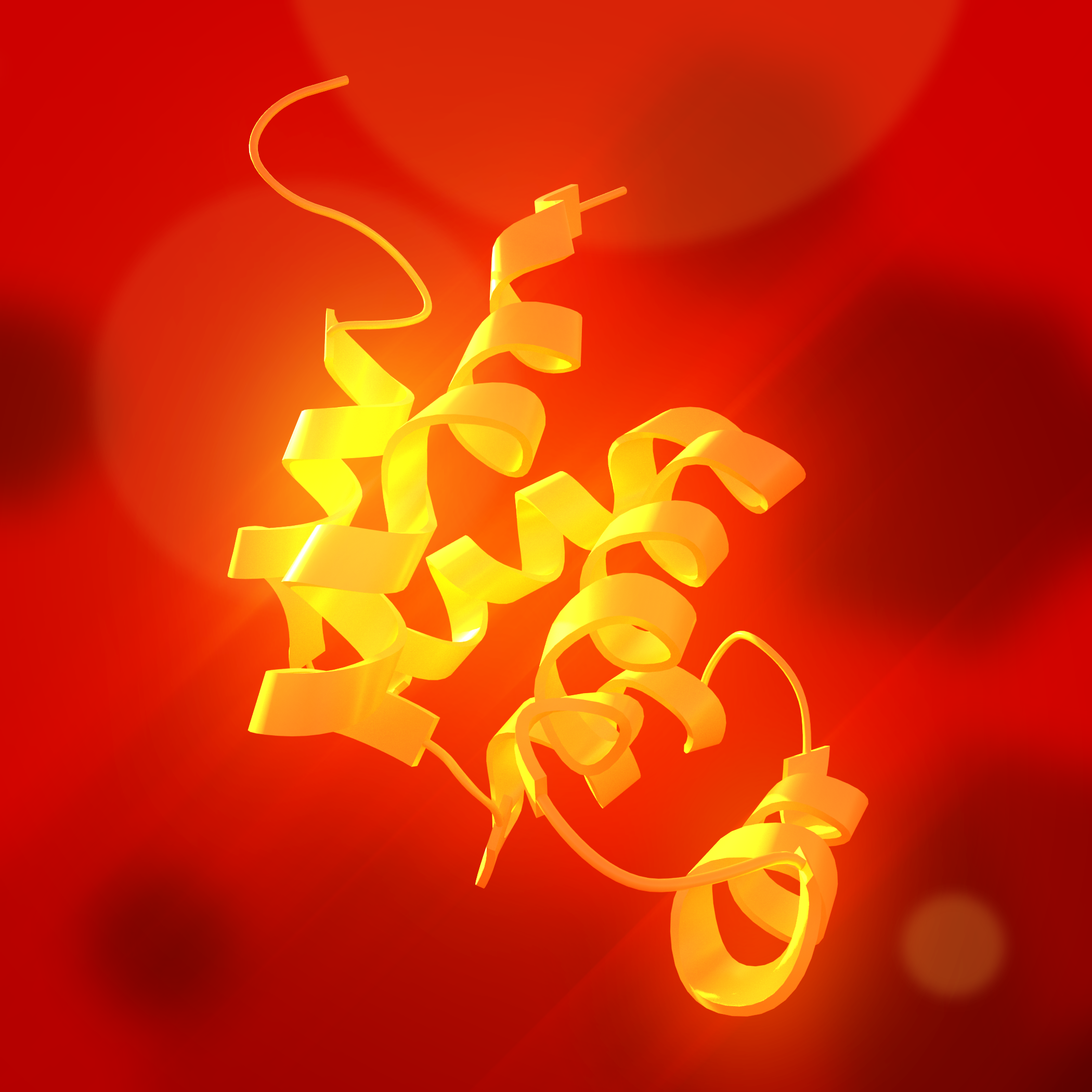

Identifiers
- Aliases: APAF1, APAF-1, CED4, apoptotic peptidase activating factor 1
- External IDs: OMIM: 602233; MGI: 1306796; GeneCards: APAF1
Available structures
| PDB | Ortholog search: PDBe RCSB |
| PDB | List of PDB id codes 1C15, 1CWW, 1CY5, 1Z6T, 2P1H, 2YGS, 3J2T, 3YGS, 4RHW, 3JBT |

Gene location (Human)
| Chr. | Chromosome 12 (human) |
| Band | 12q23.1 | Start | 98,645,290 bp |
| Band | 12q23.1 | End | 98,735,433 bp |

Gene location (Mouse)
| Chr. | Chromosome 10 (mouse) |
| Band | 10 C2|10 45.47 cM | Start | 90,989,311 bp |
| Band | 10 C2|10 45.47 cM | End | 91,082,770 bp |
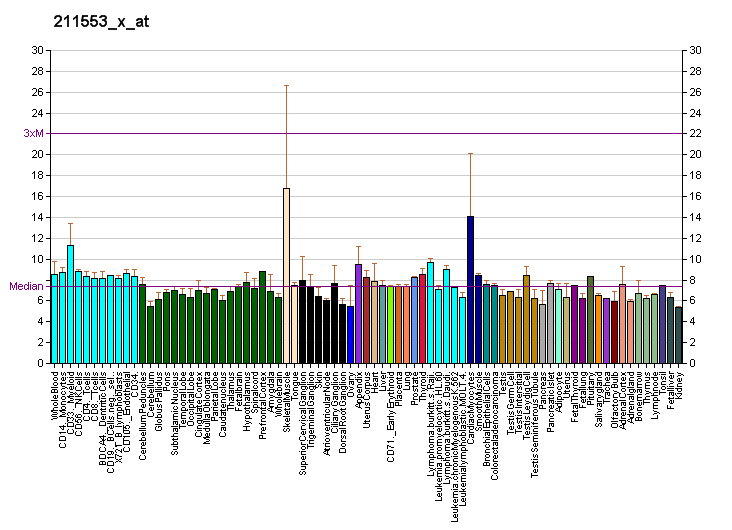

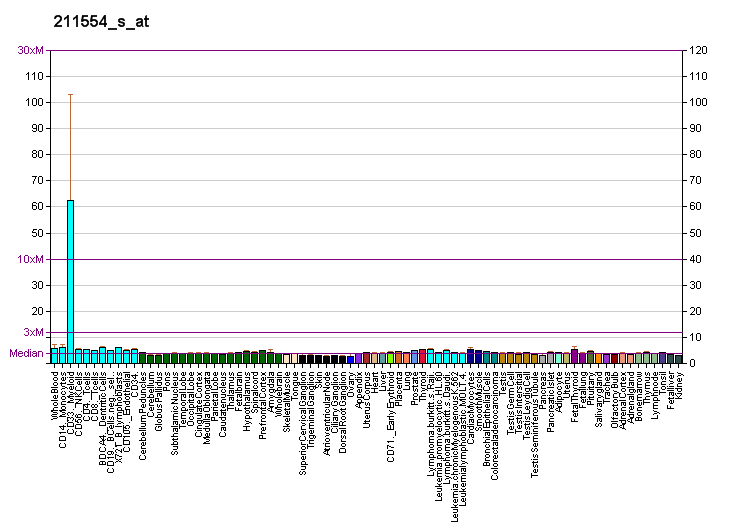

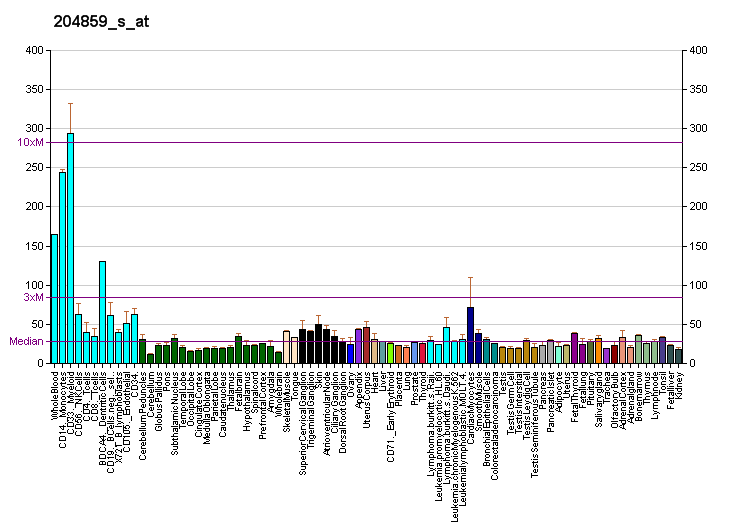
RNA expression pattern
| Bgee | Human / Mouse (ortholog); Top expressed in: monocyte; ventricular zone; blood; bone marrow cell; ganglionic eminence; epithelium of colon; granulocyte; Achilles tendon; trabecular bone; testicle / Top expressed in: granulocyte; dermis; migratory enteric neural crest cell; ureter; jejunum; vas deferens; otic vesicle; stroma of bone marrow; gastrula; ileum; More reference expression data |
| BioGPS | More reference expression data |
Gene ontology
| Molecular function | heat shock protein binding; ADP binding; protein binding; identical protein binding; ATP binding; nucleotide binding; cysteine-type endopeptidase activator activity involved in apoptotic process |
| Cellular component | cytoplasm; cytosol; extracellular exosome; nucleus; apoptosome; extracellular region; secretory granule lumen; ficolin-1-rich granule lumen; protein-containing complex |
| Biological process | cellular response to transforming growth factor beta stimulus; neuron apoptotic process; regulation of apoptotic process; cell differentiation; response to hypoxia; response to nutrient; response to G1 DNA damage checkpoint signaling; ageing; positive regulation of apoptotic signaling pathway; glial cell apoptotic process; nervous system development; multicellular organism development; cardiac muscle cell apoptotic process; intrinsic apoptotic signaling pathway; intrinsic apoptotic signaling pathway in response to endoplasmic reticulum stress; neural tube closure; brain development; positive regulation of apoptotic process; apoptotic signaling pathway; forebrain development; regulation of apoptotic DNA fragmentation; protein homooligomerization; activation of cysteine-type endopeptidase activity involved in apoptotic process; activation of cysteine-type endopeptidase activity involved in apoptotic process by cytochrome c; apoptotic process; neutrophil degranulation; negative regulation of G0 to G1 transition; kidney development |
Sources:Amigo / QuickGO
Orthologs
| Databases | NCBI: entry; OMA: entry |
| Species | Human | Mouse |
| Entrez | 317 | 11783 |
| Ensembl | ENSG00000120868 | ENSMUSG00000019979 |
| UniProt | O14727 | O88879 |
| RefSeq (mRNA) | NM_001160; NM_013229; NM_181861; NM_181868; NM_181869 | NM_001042558; NM_001282947; NM_009684 |
| RefSeq (protein) | NP_001151; NP_037361; NP_863651; NP_863658; NP_863659 | NP_001036023; NP_001269876; NP_033814 |
| Location (UCSC) | Chr 12: 98.65 – 98.74 Mb | Chr 10: 90.99 – 91.08 Mb |
| PubMed search |
- Wikidata
| View/Edit Human | View/Edit Mouse |

Apoptotic protease activating factor 1, also known as APAF1, is a human homolog of C. elegans CED-4 gene.

== Function ==
The protein was identified in the laboratory of Xiaodong Wang as an activator of caspase-3 in the presence of cytochromeC and dATP. This gene encodes a cytoplasmic protein that forms one of the central hubs in the apoptosis regulatory network. This protein contains (from the N terminal) a caspase recruitment domain (CARD), an ATPase domain (NB-ARC), few short helical domains and then several copies of the WD40 repeat domain. Upon binding cytochrome c and dATP, this protein forms an oligomeric apoptosome. The apoptosome binds and cleaves Procaspase-9 protein, releasing its mature, activated form. The precise mechanism for this reaction is still debated though work published by Guy Salvesen suggests that the apoptosome may induce caspase-9 dimerization and subsequent autocatalysis. Activated caspase-9 stimulates the subsequent caspase cascade that commits the cell to apoptosis.

Alternative splicing results in several transcript variants encoding different isoforms.

== Structure ==
APAF1 contains a CARD domain with a Greek key motif composed of six helices, a Rossman fold nucleotide binding domains, a short helical motif and a winged-helix domain.

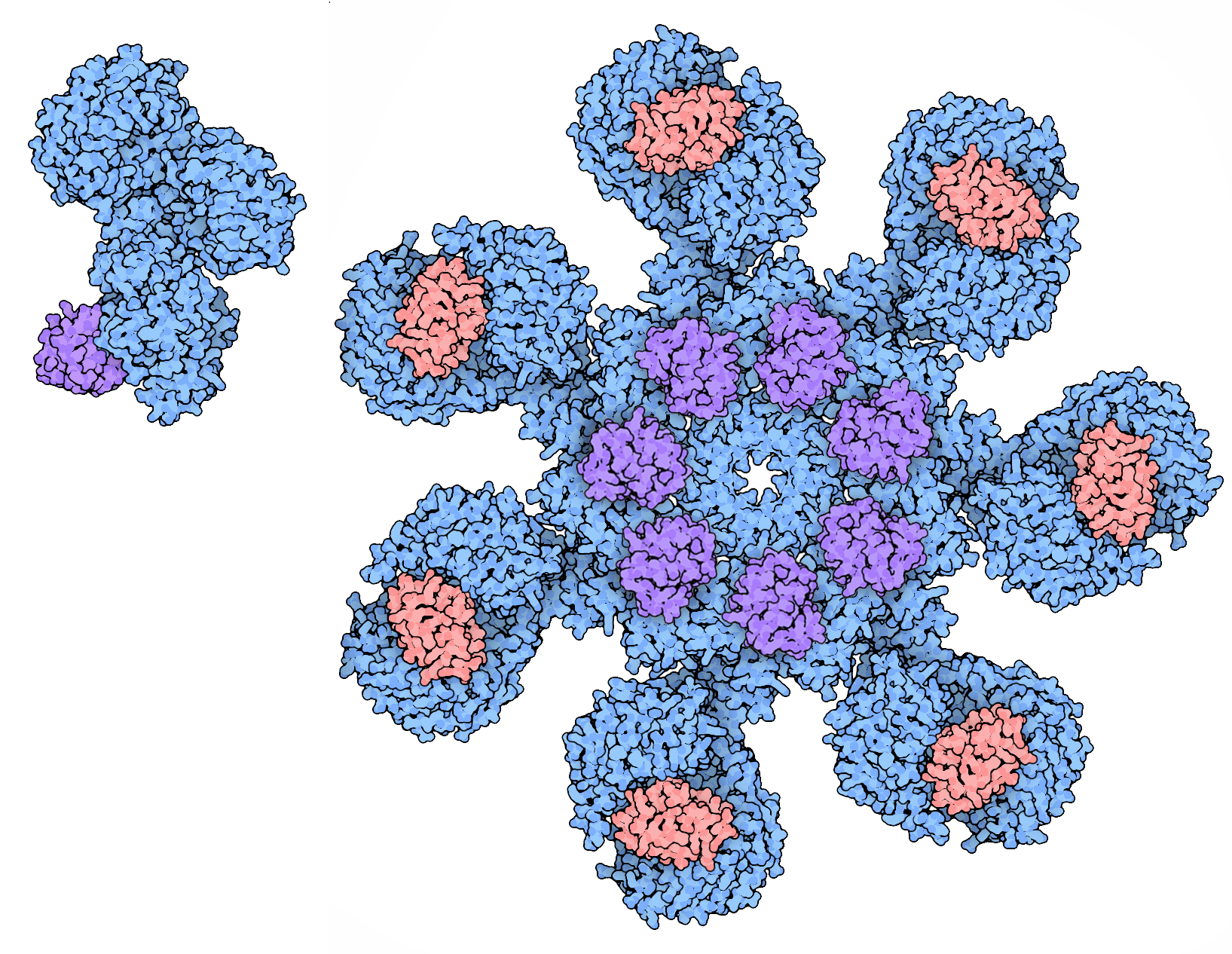

== Interactions ==
APAF1 has been shown to interact with:

- APIP,
- BCL2-like 1
- Caspase-9,
- HSPA4, and
- NLRP1.
