= Apoptosome =

Protein complex involved in the cellular apoptotic process

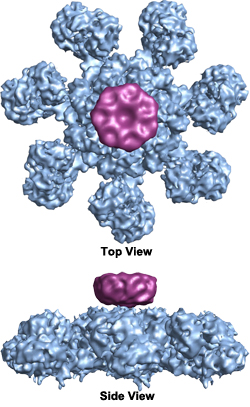
3D structure of the human apoptosome-CARD complex. blue: apoptosome platform; magenta: CARD disk

The apoptosome is a quaternary protein structure formed in the process of apoptosis. It is formed by the release of cytochrome c from the mitochondrion responses to an internal (intrinsic) or external (extrinsic) cell death stimulus. Stimuli can differ from DNA damage or viral infection to developmental signals for instance like those leading to the degradation of a tadpole’s tail.

When cytochrome c is released, it binds to the cytosolic protein Apoptotic protease activating factor-1 (Apaf-1) to facilitate the formation of the apoptosome in mammalian cells. Biochemical and structural studies have shown that this interaction is essential for apoptosome assembly. Additionally, the nucleotide dATP binds to Apaf-1 as a third component, although its precise role in the process remains under investigation.

The mammalian apoptosome had never been crystallized, but a human Apaf-1/cytochrome-c apoptosome has been imaged at lower (2 nm) resolution by cryogenic transmission electron microscopy in 2002, showing a heptameric wheel-like particle with 7-fold symmetry. Recently, a medium resolution (9.5 Ångström) structure of human apoptosome was also solved by cryo-electron microscopy, which allows unambiguous inference for positions of all the Apaf-1 domains (CARD, NBARC and WD40) and cytochrome c. A crystal structure of the monomeric, inactive Apaf-1 subunit (PDB 3SFZ) is currently obtainable. Following its formation, the apoptosome can then recruit and activate the inactive pro-caspase-9. Once activated, this initiator caspase can then activate effector caspases and trigger a cascade of events leading to apoptosis.

== History ==
The term “apoptosome” was introduced firstly in Yoshihide Tsujimoto’s 1998 paper; “The role of Bcl-2 family proteins in apoptosis: Apoptosomes or mitochondria?” The apoptosome was previously recognized as a ternary complex involving caspase-9 and B-cell lymphoma-extra-large (Bcl-XL), which each bind to a specific APAF-1 domain. This complex was believed to play a regulatory role in mammalian cell death. An article published in The Journal of Chemistry, identified Apaf-1 as a regulator of apoptosis, responsible for activating procaspase-9.

In 1999, the criteria defining an apoptosome were established. The first criteria were that it had to be large complex (greater that 1.3 million daltons). Secondly, its formation requires the hydrolysis of a high energy bond of ATP and dATP. Finally, it must activate procaspase-9 in its functional form. The formation of this complex marks the point of no return in apoptosis. The stable multimeric complex of Apaf-1 and cytochrome c met these criteria and became known as the apoptosome.

The apoptosome was thought to be a multimeric complex for two reasons. The first reason being, to bring multiple procaspase-9 molecules close together for cleavage. The second reason being, to raise the threshold for apoptosis, therefore nonspecific leakage for cytochrome c, would not result in apoptosis. Once the apoptosome was identified as the activator of procaspase-9, research into mutations affecting this pathway gained significance and became an important research area. Studies explored its role in conditions such as human leukemia cells, ovarian cancer and viral infections. Research continues to investigate this pathway in further detail. There are hidden routes for cell death as well, which are independent of Apaf-1 and therefore the apoptosome. These routes are also independent of caspase-3 and 9. These hidden pathways for apoptosis are slower, but may prove useful with further research.

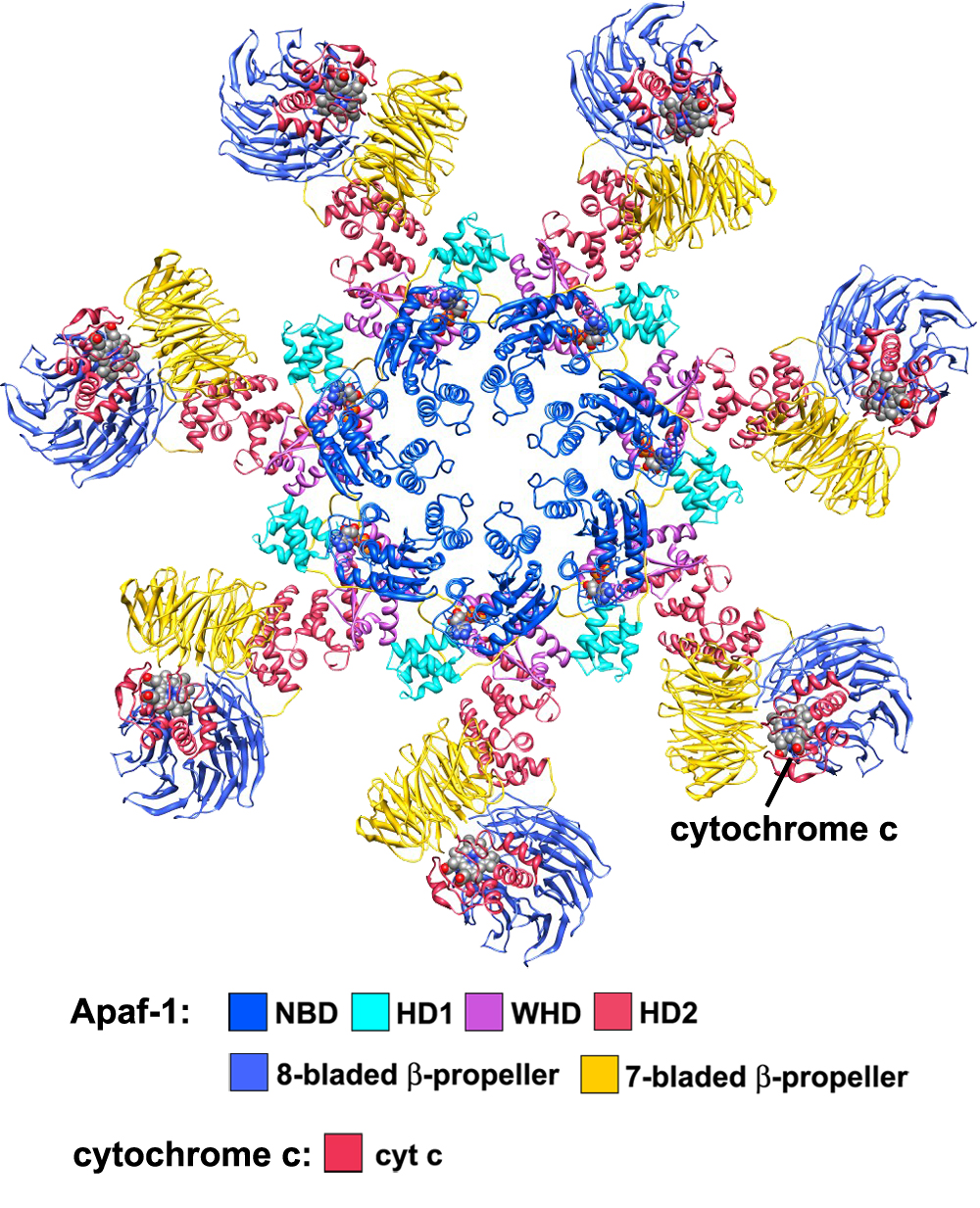
Pseudo atomic structure of the human apoptosome (Yuan et al. 2010, Structure of an apoptosome-procaspase-9 CARD complex

== Structure ==
The apoptosome is a protein complex assembled around the adapter protein Apaf-1 during mitochondria-mediated apoptosis, which is stimulated by cellular stress. To form the apoptosome, ATP/dATP and cytochrome c must be present in the cytosol. In response to cellular stress, the mitochondria release cytochrome c into the cytoplasm. Cytochrome c then binds to the C-terminal region of Apaf-1, which contains WD-40 repeats. This interaction promotes the oligomerization of Apaf-1 molecules, forming a wheel-like apoptosome complex. During this process, procaspase-9 is recruited to the CARD domain (caspase Activation and Recruitment Domain) located at the N-terminus of Apaf-1. Once assembled, the apoptosome activates caspases, which cause a controlled break down of the cell.

The human apoptosome forms a heptameric, wheel-shaped complex with sevenfold rotational symmetry. Its three-dimensional structure was first determined at 27 Å resolution using electron cryomicroscopy, with a calculated mass of 1 megadalton (Mda) (Acehan et al. 2002). High-resolution cryogenic electron microscopy (cryo-EM) have revealed that each Apaf-1 subunit extends outward via HD2 (Helical Domain 2) arms into a V-shaped regulatory region composed of two β-propeller domains. These domains are formed by 15 WD40 repeats: one with seven blades and the other with eight. Cytochrome c binds within the cleft between the β-propellers, stabilizing the extended conformation of Apaf-1 and facilitating nucleotide exchange from ADP to ATP/dATP.

The central hub of the apoptosome is formed by the NOD (nucleotide-binding ogliomerization domain), which includes the NBD, HD1 and WHD subdomains. These regions enable oligomerization and form the structural correlations of the complex. The CARD domains of Apaf-1 are flexibly attached above the central hub, and upon binding procaspase-9, they organize into a disk-like, acentric spiral structure on top of the hub.

The NOD domains of Apaf-1 form a structural platform lined with conserved helix-loop-helix motifs that create a central pore, helping stabilize the apoptosome. Its assembly depends on nucleotide exchange and requires structural changes in Apaf-1, triggered by cytochrome c binding.

Procaspase-9 binds to the apoptosome through its N-terminal CARD, which binds with Apaf-1 CARDs through specific binding surfaces (Type I, II and III). These CARDs form a left-handed spiral of Apaf-1/pc-9 CARD pairs. The most common configuration consists of four Apaf-1 and three or four procaspase-9 CARDs, forming a disk on top of the platform. This corresponds to approximately three to four procaspase-9 molecules recruited per seven Apaf-1 subunits. Not all Apaf-1 CARDs participate in the spiral due to linker length constraints.

Activation of procaspase-9 happens in two ways: by forming dimers with other procaspase-9 molecules (homodimers) and by pairing with Apaf-1 subunits (heterodimers). The apoptosome platform promotes proximity-induced dimerization of procaspase-9 molecules, enabling their activation. Catalytic domains of procaspase-9 may also form heterodimers with Apaf-1 subunits. These interactions may activate other proteins involved in cell death, such as caspase-3. Since the catalytic domains are connected to the CARD disk by flexible linkers, they can occupy variable positions on the central hub.

In mammalian cells, cytochrome c is essential for apoptosome assembly and helps stabilize the complex. However, in some invertebrates like C. elegans and Drosophila, the apoptosome can assemble and activate caspases without cytochrome c.

Several accessory proteins have been observed to co-purify with the apoptosome, including caspase-3, which may interact with the complex either directly or through active caspase-9. Caspase-3 can also cleave caspase-9, regulating its dissociation from the apoptosome and potentially amplifying the apoptotic signal.

Apaf-1 has an estimated molecular weight of about 140 kDa and consists of three major regions:

- The N-terminal CARD domain:

This domain allows Apaf-1 to bind procaspase-9 and recruit it to the apoptosome.

- The central NB-ARC/NOD domain:

This region binds ATP/dATP and enables Apaf-1 to oligomerize. It includes the nucleotide-binding domain (NBD), HD1, and the winged-helix domain (WHD), and belongs to the AAA+ ATPase family.

- The C-terminal WD40 region:

Composed of 15 WD40 repeats, this region forms two β-propeller domains involved in cytochrome c binding and regulation of apoptosome assembly.

=== Detailed structural features ===
- The nucleotide-binding domain (NBD) contains conserved Walker A and Walker B motifs essential for nucleotide binding.
- HD1 and WHD interact to form the NOD core, mediating oligomerization and structural assembly.
- HD2 connects the NOD to the regulatory β-propeller region and contributes to the flexibility and positioning of the spokes.
- The two β-propellers form a cleft that binds cytochrome c. This interaction is stabilized by hydrogen bonds and salt bridges.

Apoptsome assembly triggers a chain reaction that activates procaspase-9 through interactions between CARD domains, followed by homodimerization or heterodimerization. These interactions ensure that apoptosis proceeds in a regulated and efficient manner, with the apoptosome serving as a flexible platform that supports caspase activation.

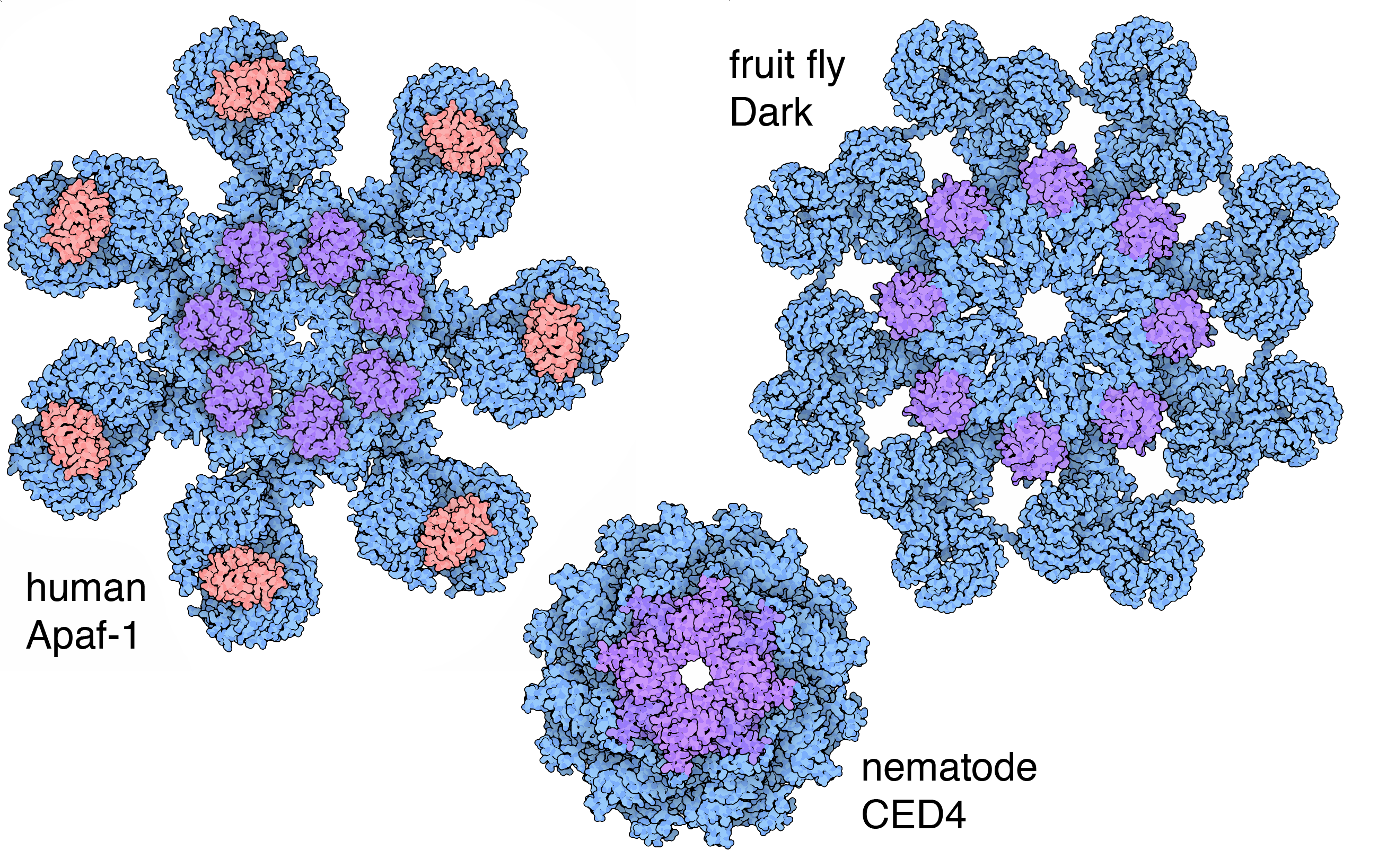
Human, fruit fly, & nematode apoptosomes

== Non-human organisms ==
The above descriptions are for the human apoptosome. Apoptosome complex structures from other organisms have many similarities, but are of quite different sizes and numbers of subunits, as shown in the figure. The fruit-fly system, called Dark, has a ring of eight subunits (PDB 4V4L). The nematode apoptosome, called CED-4, is octameric but much smaller (PDB 3LQQ), and it does not include the regions that would bind cytochrome C.

== Mechanism of action ==
=== Initiation ===
The initiation of apoptosome action aligns to the first steps in the programmed cell death (PCD) pathway. Apoptosis can be triggered in one of two ways in animals. The first being: the extrinsic pathway, which involves the binding of extracellular ligands to transmembrane receptors. The second being the intrinsic pathway, which takes place in the mitochondria. This intrinsic pathway involves the release of cytochrome C from the mitochondria and subsequent binding to the cytosolic protein Apaf-1. The release of cytochrome c is therefore necessary for the initiation of apoptosome action, and this release is regulated in several ways, most notably by the detection of calcium ion levels.

=== Cytochrome c release ===
Cytochrome c release is thought to occur via two distinct mechanisms. The first involves the mitochondrial permeability transition pore (mPTP), which opens in response to elevated mitochondrial Ca^{2+} levels and oxidative stress, leading to the release of intermembrane space proteins. The mPTP has several components, including the adenine nucleotide translocase (ANT), the voltage-dependent anion channel (VDAC), and the mitochondrial F1Fo ATP synthase. The opening of the mPTP causes mitochondrial swelling, rupturing the outer mitochondrial membrane, which allows proteins like cytochrome c to leak into the cytosol. This permeability change is often associated with mitochondrial depolarization and the collapse of the mitochondrial membrane potential, resulting in a halt in ATP production. The discovery of the pharmaceutical agent cyclosporine A (CsA), which inhibits this process, has provided further insights into this mechanism.

A second pathway, independent of the mPTP, involves the VDAC, which can be directly opened by pro-apoptotic members of the Bcl-2 protein family. These proteins induce the permeabilization of the outer mitochondrial membrane, facilitating the release of cytochrome c from the intermembrane space into the cytosol. This mechanism also contributes to the collapse of the mitochondrial membrane potential and a subsequent loss of mitochondrial function, promoting apoptotic or necrotic cell death.

=== Apaf-1 ===
==== Absence of cytochrome c ====
In the absence of cytochrome c, Apaf-1 exists in its monomeric form; it is thought that the WD-40 domain remain folded back onto the protein, keeping Apaf-1 in an auto inhibited state. In addition, several regions are so tightly bound that the protein is unable to bind to anything else. Mass spectrometry analysis has determined that in the autoinhibited, or "locked" state, ADP is bound to the ATPase domain of Apaf-1. In this state, this protein is singular, and incapable of activating any caspases.

==== Presence of cytochrome c ====
Cytochrome c binds to the WD-40 domain of Apaf-1. This allows for the "lock" to be released, meaning this domain is no longer autoinhibited. However, the CARD and NB-ARC domains remains in autoinhibited state. The CARD domain will only be released from this lock when Apaf-1 is bound to (d) ATP/ATP; when ATP binds, the CARD domain will then be allowed to bind to Caspase-9. When ADP is in the ATPase domain, oligomerization is inhibited. Thus, the binding of ATP also allows for the oligomerization of Apaf-1 into the heptagonal structure necessary for downstream caspase activation. Mutations in the ATPase domain render the protein inactive; however, the method of controlling this ADP-ATP exchange is unclear. Oligomerization can thus only occur in the presence of 7 cytochrome c molecules, 7 Apaf-1 proteins and sufficient (d)ATP/ATP. The ATPase domain belongs to the AAA+ family of ATPases; this family is known for its ability to link to other ATPase domains and form hexa- or heptamers. The apoptosome is considered active when there are seven Apaf-1 molecules arranged in a wheel structure, oriented such that the NB-ARC domains rest in the centre.

=== Active action ===
This functional apoptosome then can serve as a platform for the activation of caspase-9. Caspase-9 exists as a zymogen in the cytosol and is estimated to be present at 20 nM in cells. Although it is known that the zymogen does not need to be cleaved in order to become active,[16] the activity of procaspase-9 may increase significantly once cleaved. There are two main hypotheses to explain caspase-9 activation. The first suggests that the apoptosome serves as a location for the dimerization of two caspase-9 molecules before cleavage; this hypothesis was favoured by Reidl & Salvasen in 2007. The second is that cleavage takes place while caspase-9 is still in its monomeric form. In either case, caspase-9 activation leads to the activation of a full caspase cascade and subsequent cell death. It has been suggested that the evolutionary reason for the multimeric protein complex activating the caspase cascade is to ensure trace amounts of cytochrome c do not accidentally cause apoptosis.

== Research areas ==
=== Mutations in the apoptosome pathway ===
Apoptosis is essential for normal development, immune defense, and tissue maintenance. However, mutations in the apoptosome pathway can lead to serious consequences by either inhibiting or overactivating programmed cell death. Both scenarios are linked to a wide range of diseases.

- Reduced apoptosome activity is associated with cancer, where defective apoptosis allows abnormal cells to survive and proliferate. This is seen in cancers like chronic lymphocytic leukemia, where overexpression of the anti-apoptotic protein BCL-2 helps cancer cells survive. Another example is Apaf-1-ALT, a mutant form of Apaf-1 found in prostate cancer. This isoform ends after HD1, and therefore lacks the WHD, arm, and regulatory regions. As a result, it is unable to initiate apoptosis properly.
- Increased apoptosome activity has been linked to neurodegenerative disorders like Alzheimer’s, Parkinson’s and Huntington’s disease, where functional cells are lost prematurely. This is often triggered by misfolded proteins, oxidative stress or mitochondrial dysfunction, leading to activation of pro-apoptotic BCL-2 family proteins and caspases. Acute brain injuries, such as stroke or neonatal traumatic brain injury, also involve excessive apoptosis. Many cells undergo delayed death through mitochrondria-mediated apoptosis. This is especially pronounced in the developing brain, which naturally expresses high levels of pro-apoptotic proteins and is highly primed for apoptosis. As a result, increased apoptosome activity contributes to additional tissue damage beyond the initial injury. In Helicobacter pylori infection, bacterial toxins directly activate BAX and BAK (pro-apoptotic proteins), triggering mitochondrial outer membrane permeabilization and increased apoptosome activity in gastric epithelial cells. This contributes to cell death and the formation of ulcers.

=== Repression of apoptosis and cancer ===
Under normal conditions, genetic or biochemical abnormalities trigger apoptosis to eliminate damaged or abnormal cells. However, cancer cells often acquire mutations that suppress this process, allowing them to survive. Cancer therapies like ionizing radiation have been developed to activate these repressed PCD (programmed cell death) pathways, often through overstimulation.

=== Cancer therapy ===
Inhibition of apoptosis is one of the hallmarks of cancer. Therefore, finding ways to overcome this suppression—by activating the apoptosome and triggering caspase activity—is a key goal in the development of new cancer therapies.

The ability to directly activate the apoptosome is especially valuable, as it enables the removal of mutated cells that would otherwise evade destruction. External stimulation of apoptosome assembly can restore apoptosis and eliminate cancer cells that no longer respond to natural cell death signals. Several strategies are currently being investigated to achieve this, including:

- Recombinant biomolecules
- Antisense strategies
- Gene therapy
- Small-molecule screening and combinatorial chemistry

These approaches aim to correct imbalances in cell death regulation—whether apoptosis is too weak (as in cancer) or too strong (as in degenerative diseases).

=== Bcl-2 as a therapeutic target ===
A major focus in apoptosis-targeted therapy is the Bcl-2 protein, the first identified oncogene known to suppress apoptosis. Bcl-2 is frequently overexpressed in tumors, which helps cancer cells survive and resist chemotherapy [18].

Inhibiting Bcl-2 can restore the apoptotic response. Scientists have developed Bcl-2 inhibitors that allow pro-apoptotic proteins like Bax and Bak to initiate mitochondrial outer membrane permeabilization (MOMP), thereby triggering apoptosis. These inhibitors essentially "unblock" the pathway that Bcl-2 has suppressed.

=== Caspases and their role in therapy ===
Another set of targets are the caspases, particularly caspase-3 and caspase-9, which are essential for executing apoptosis. In diseases where excessive cell death is the problem, such as neurodegenerative diseases, stroke, heart attack, and liver injury, inhibiting caspase activity can be beneficial. Caspase inhibitors are currently in preclinical testing and have shown encouraging results. For instance, researchers have developed a reversible caspase-3 inhibitor, called M-826, which has shown neuroprotective effects in mice. In one study, M-826 reduced brain tissue damage, and in a Huntington’s disease model, it prevented the death of striatal neurons—suggesting strong therapeutic potential for further research.

=== New potential targets for molecular therapy ===
The formation of the Apaf-1/caspase-9 apoptosome complex is a critical step in the apoptotic cascade. Due to its central role in regulating cell death, the apoptosome has become a target for therapeutic intervention in diseases characterized by either excessive or insufficient apoptosis.

One strategy involves identifying new drugs that either stabilize or inhibit apoptosome assembly, depending on the therapeutic goal. For example, in ischemia-induced apoptosis in heart cells, the naturally occurring compound taurine has been shown to prevent apoptosome formation. It appears to do so by reducing caspase-9 expression, a key apoptosome component, without disrupting mitochondrial function.

However, it's important to note that Apaf-1 and caspase-9 may have additional roles outside of apoptosome formation, so altering their levels could have unintended consequences. Despite promising results from early studies, several challenges remain that currently limit the clinical use of these potential drugs [18]. Another emerging approach is the development of small molecules that inhibit apoptosome activity by interfering with intracellular protein–protein interactions, rather than altering gene expression. This allows for more targeted modulation of apoptosis, without affecting the overall transcription of apoptosome components.

Recent structural studies of the apoptosome have greatly contributed to this field by offering molecular-level insight into how the complex forms and functions. These advances may pave the way for the design of more precise and effective apoptosome-based therapies in the future.

== See also ==
- The Proteolysis Map
