= Caspase-9 =

Enzyme found in humans

CASP9
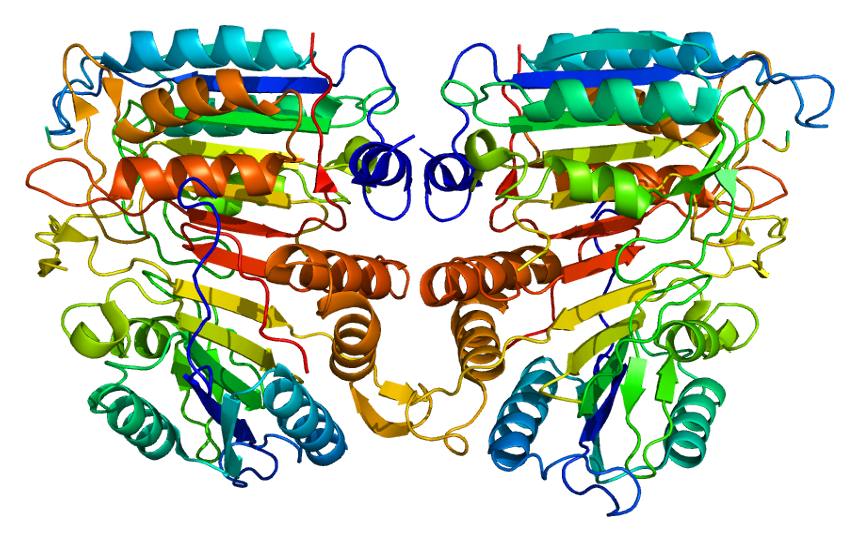

Identifiers
- Aliases: CASP9, APAF-3, APAF3, ICE-LAP6, MCH6, PPP1R56, caspase 9
- External IDs: OMIM: 602234; MGI: 1277950; GeneCards: CASP9
Available structures
PDB	Ortholog search: PDBe RCSB
PDB	List of PDB id codes 4RHW, 1JXQ, 1NW9, 2AR9, 3D9T, 3V3K, 3YGS
Enzyme activity
EC #	BRENDA	ExPASy	KEGG	MetaCyc
3.4.22.62	↗	↗	↗	↗

Gene location (Human)
Chr.	Chromosome 1 (human)
Band	1p36.21	Start	15,490,832 bp
Band	1p36.21	End	15,526,534 bp

Gene location (Mouse)
Chr.	Chromosome 4 (mouse)
Band	4|4 D3	Start	141,520,923 bp
Band	4|4 D3	End	141,543,287 bp
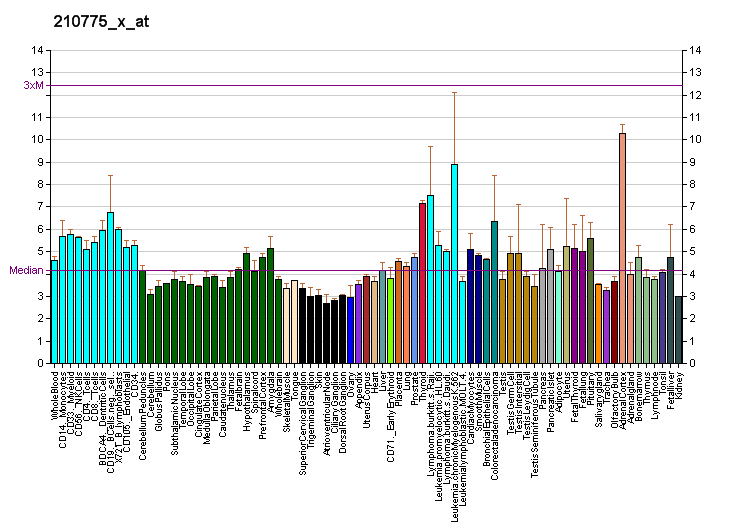

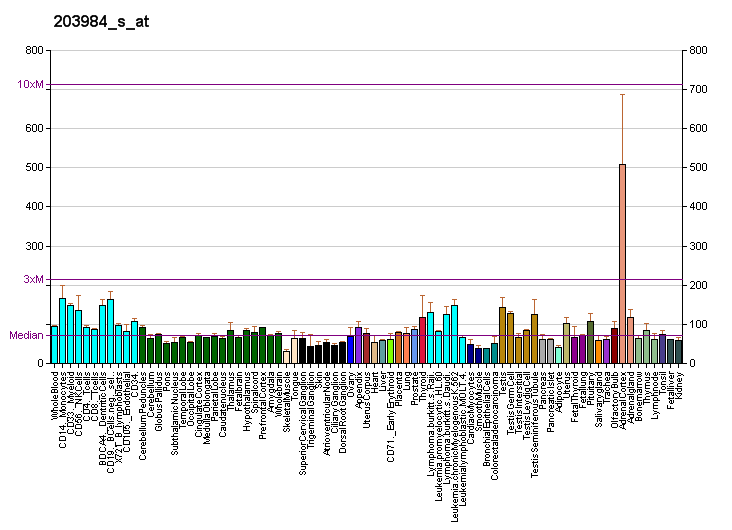
RNA expression pattern
Bgee	Human / Mouse (ortholog); Top expressed in: right uterine tube; left ovary; secondary oocyte; right ovary; pituitary gland; anterior pituitary; right testis; apex of heart; left testis; left lobe of thyroid gland / Top expressed in: ureter; medullary collecting duct; cumulus cell; granulocyte; Region I of hippocampus proper; saccule; superior surface of tongue; gallbladder; pineal gland; lumbar spinal ganglion; More reference expression data
BioGPS	More reference expression data
Gene ontology
Molecular function	cysteine-type peptidase activity; SH3 domain binding; peptidase activity; protein binding; enzyme activator activity; hydrolase activity; protein kinase binding; cysteine-type endopeptidase activity involved in execution phase of apoptosis; cysteine-type endopeptidase activity; identical protein binding; cysteine-type endopeptidase activity involved in apoptotic signaling pathway; cysteine-type endopeptidase activity involved in apoptotic process
Cellular component	cytoplasm; cytosol; mitochondrion; apoptosome; nucleus; protein-containing complex
Biological process	regulation of apoptotic process; response to estradiol; response to organic cyclic compound; signal transduction in response to DNA damage; cellular response to UV; response to antibiotic; cellular response to organic cyclic compound; ageing; platelet formation; glial cell apoptotic process; cellular response to dexamethasone stimulus; proteolysis; cellular response to DNA damage stimulus; response to lipopolysaccharide; positive regulation of neuron apoptotic process; activation of cysteine-type endopeptidase activity involved in apoptotic process by cytochrome c; intrinsic apoptotic signaling pathway in response to DNA damage; extrinsic apoptotic signaling pathway in absence of ligand; regulation of response to DNA damage stimulus; response to cobalt ion; activation of cysteine-type endopeptidase activity involved in apoptotic process; response to UV; execution phase of apoptosis; positive regulation of apoptotic process; apoptotic process; kidney development; response to ischemia; leukocyte apoptotic process
Sources:Amigo / QuickGO
Orthologs
Databases	NCBI: entry; OMA: entry
Species	Human	Mouse
Entrez	842	12371
Ensembl	ENSG00000132906	ENSMUSG00000028914
UniProt	P55211	Q8C3Q9
RefSeq (mRNA)	NM_001229; NM_001278054; NM_032996	NM_001277932; NM_015733; NM_001355176
RefSeq (protein)	NP_001220; NP_001264983; NP_127463	NP_001264861; NP_056548; NP_001342105
Location (UCSC)	Chr 1: 15.49 – 15.53 Mb	Chr 4: 141.52 – 141.54 Mb
PubMed search
- Wikidata
View/Edit Human	View/Edit Mouse

Caspase-9 is an enzyme that in humans is encoded by the CASP9 gene. It is an initiator caspase, critical to the apoptotic pathway found in many tissues. Caspase-9 homologs have been identified in all mammals for which they are known to exist, such as Mus musculus and Pan troglodytes.

Caspase-9 belongs to a family of caspases, cysteine-aspartic proteases involved in apoptosis and cytokine signalling. Apoptotic signals cause the release of cytochrome c from mitochondria and activation of apaf-1 (apoptosome), which then cleaves the pro-enzyme of caspase-9 into the active dimer form. Regulation of this enzyme occurs through phosphorylation by an allosteric inhibitor, inhibiting dimerization and inducing a conformational change.

Correct caspase-9 function is required for apoptosis, leading to the normal development of the central nervous system. Caspase-9 has multiple additional cellular functions that are independent of its role in apoptosis. Nonapoptotic roles of caspase-9 include regulation of necroptosis, cellular differentiation, innate immune response, sensory neuron maturation, mitochondrial homeostasis, corticospinal circuit organization, and ischemic vascular injury. Without correct function, abnormal tissue development can occur leading to abnormal function, diseases and premature death. Caspase-9 loss-of-function mutations have been associated with immunodeficiency/lymphoproliferation, neural tube defects, and Li-Fraumeni-like syndrome. Increased caspase-9 activity is implicated in the progression of amyotrophic lateral sclerosis, retinal detachment, and slow-channel syndrome, as well as various other neurological, autoimmune, and cardiovascular disorders.

Different protein isoforms of caspase-9 are produced due to alternative splicing.

== Structure ==
Similar to other caspases, caspase-9 has three domains: N-terminal pro-domain, large subunit, and a small subunit. The N-terminal pro-domain is also called the long pro-domain and this contains the caspase activation domain (CARD) motif. The pro-domain is linked to the catalytic domain by a linker loop.

The caspase-9 monomer consists of one large and one small subunit, both comprising the catalytic domain. Differing from the normally conserved active site motif QACRG in other caspases, caspase-9 has the motif QACGG.

When dimerized, caspase-9 has two different active site conformations within each dimer. One site closely resembles the catalytic site of other caspases, whereas the second has no 'activation loop', disrupting the catalytic machinery in that particular active site. Surface loops around the active site are short, giving rise to broad substrate specificity as the substrate-binding cleft is more open. Within caspase-9's active site, in order for catalytic activity to occur there has to be specific amino acids in the right position. Amino acid Asp at position P1 is essential, with a preference for amino acid His at position P2.

== Localization ==
Within the cell, caspase-9 in humans is found in the mitochondria, cytosol, and nucleus.

=== Protein expression ===
Caspase-9 in humans is expressed in fetus and adult tissues. Tissue expression of caspase-9 is ubiquitous with the highest expression in the brain and heart, specifically at the developmental stage of an adult in the heart's muscle cells. The liver, pancreas, and skeletal muscle express this enzyme at a moderate level, and all other tissues express caspase-9 at low levels.

== Mechanism ==
Active caspase-9 works as an initiating caspase by cleaving, thus activating downstream executioner caspases, initiating apoptosis. Once activated, caspase-9 goes on to cleave caspase-3, -6, and -7, initiating the caspase cascade as they cleave several other cellular targets.

When caspase-9 is inactive, it exists in the cytosol as a zymogen, in its monomer form. It is then recruited and activated by the CARDs in apaf-1, recognizing the CARDs in caspase-9.

=== Processing ===
Before activation can occur, caspase-9 has to be processed. Initially, caspase-9 is made as an inactive single-chain zymogen. Processing occurs when the apoptosome binds to pro-caspase-9 as apaf-1 assists in the autoproteolytic processing of the zymogen. The processed caspase-9 stays bound to the apoptosome complex, forming a holoenzyme.

=== Activation ===
Activation occurs when caspase-9 dimerizes, and there are two different ways for which this can occur:

1. Caspase-9 is auto-activated when it binds to apaf-1(apoptosome), as apaf-1 oligomerizes the precursor molecules of pro-caspase-9.
2. Previously activated caspases can cleave caspase-9, causing its dimerization.

=== Catalytic activity ===
Caspase-9 has a preferred cleavage sequence of Leu-Gly-His-Asp-(cut)-X.

== Regulation ==
Negative regulation of caspase-9 occurs through phosphorylation. This is done by a serine-threonine kinase, Akt, on serine-196 which inhibits the activation and protease activity of caspase-9, suppressing caspase-9 and further activation of apoptosis. Akt acts as an allosteric inhibitor of caspase-9 because the site of phosphorylation of serine-196 is far from the catalytic site. The inhibitor affects the dimerization of caspase-9 and causes a conformational change that affects the substrate-binding cleft of caspase-9.

Akt can act on both processed and unprocessed caspase-9 in-vitro, where phosphorylation on processed caspase-9 occurs on the large subunit.

== Deficiencies and mutations ==
A deficiency in caspase-9 largely affects the brain and its development. The effects of having a mutation or deficiency in this caspase compared to others is detrimental. The initiating role caspase-9 plays in apoptosis is the cause for the severe effects seen in those with an atypical caspase-9.

Mice with insufficient caspase-9 have a main phenotype of an affected or abnormal brain. Larger brains due to a decrease in apoptosis, resulting in an increase of extra neurons is an example of a phenotype seen in caspase-9 deficient mice. Those homozygous for no caspase-9 die perinatally as a result of an abnormally developed cerebrum.

In humans, expression of caspase-9 varies from tissue to tissue, and the different levels have a physiological role. Low amounts of caspase-9 leads to cancer and neurodegenerative diseases like Alzheimer's disease. Further alterations at single-nucleotide polymorphism (SNP) levels and whole gene levels of caspase-9 can cause germ-line mutations linked to non-Hodgkin's lymphoma. Certain polymorphisms in the promoter of caspase-9 enhances the rate at which caspase-9 is expressed, and this can increase a person's risk of lung cancer.

== Clinical significance ==
The effects of abnormal caspase-9 levels or function impacts the clinical world. The impact caspase-9 has on the brain can lead to future work in inhibition through targeted therapy, specifically with diseases associated with the brain as this enzyme may take part in the developmental pathways of neuronal disorders.

The introduction of caspases may also have medical benefits. In the context of graft versus host disease, caspase-9 can be introduced as an inducible switch. In the presence of a small molecule, it will dimerize and trigger apoptosis, eliminating lymphocytes.

=== iCasp9 ===
iCasp9 (inducible caspase-9) is a type of control system for chimeric antigen receptor T cells (CAR T cells). CAR T cells are genetically modified T cells that exhibit cytotoxicity to tumor cells. Evidence shows that CAR T cells are effective in treating B-cell malignancies. However, as CAR T cells introduce toxicity, user control of the cells and their targets is critical. One of the various ways to exert control over CAR T cell is through drug-controlled synthetic systems. iCasp9 was created by modifying caspase-9 and fusing it with the FK506 binding protein. iCasp9 can be added to the CAR T cells as an inducible suicide gene.

If therapy with CAR T cells results in severe side effects, iCasp9 can be used to halt treatment. Administering a small-molecule drug such as rapamycin causes the drug to bind to the FK506 domain. This, in turn, induces expression of caspase-9, which triggers cell death of the CAR T cells.

== Alternative transcripts ==
Through alternative splicing, four difference caspase-9 variants are produced.

=== Caspase-9α (9L) ===
This variant is used as the reference sequence, and it has full cysteine protease activity.

=== Caspase-9β (9S) ===
Isoform 2 doesn't include exons 3, 4, 5, and 6; it is missing amino acids 140-289. Caspase-9S doesn't have central catalytic domain, therefore it functions as an inhibitor of caspase-9α by attaching to the apoptosome, suppressing the caspase enzyme cascade and apoptosis. Caspase-9β is referred to as the endogenous dominant-negative isoform.

=== Caspase-9γ ===
This variant is missing amino acids 155-416, and for amino acids 152-154, the sequence AYI is changed to TVL.

=== Isoform 4 ===
In comparison with the reference sequence, it is missing amino acids 1-83.

== Interactions ==
Caspase-9 has been shown to interact with:

- APAF1
- BIRC2,
- Baculoviral IAP repeat-containing protein 3,
- Caspase 8,
- NLRP1, and
- XIAP.

Overview of signal transduction pathways involved in apoptosis.

== See also ==
- The Proteolysis Map
- Caspase
- Caspase-3
- Apoptosome
- Apaf-1
