= Thirumala-Devi Kanneganti =

Indian immunologist

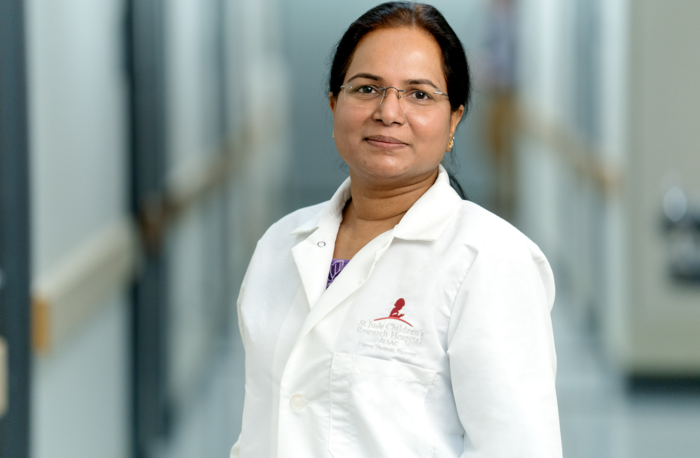
- Born: Kothagudem, India
- Education: Kakatiya University; Osmania University (M.Sc., PhD)
- Known for: Investigating fundamentals of innate immunity; Elucidating inflammasomes; Pioneering the concept of PANoptosis; Identifying molecular mechanisms of disease
- Awards: American Association of Immunology - Thermo Fisher Meritorious Career Award (2024); Fellow in the American Association for the Advancement of Science (2022); Rosalind Franklin Society Special Award in Science (2022); Outstanding Scientist Award, AAIS in Cancer Research (2022); Fellow in the American Academy of Microbiology, American Society for Microbiology (2021); Seymour & Vivian Milstein Award for Excellence in Interferon and Cytokine Research (2018); Eli Lilly and Company-Elanco Research Award, American Society for Microbiology (2017); Outstanding macrophage researcher Dolph O. Adams award, Society for Leukocyte Biology (2017); Investigator Award from the American Association of Immunology-BD Biosciences (2015)
- Scientific career
- Fields: Immunology
- Workplaces: St. Jude Children's Research Hospital
- Website: https://www.stjude.org/kanneganti

Thirumala-Devi Kanneganti is an immunologist and one of the founding scientists of the inflammasome field, ranked among the top researchers in innate immunity. She is the Vice Chair of the Department of Immunology, Director of the Center of Excellence for Innate Immunity and Inflammation and holder of the Rose Marie Thomas Endowed Chair at St. Jude Children's Research Hospital. Her research interests include investigating fundamental mechanisms of innate immunity, including inflammasomes and inflammatory cell death, PANoptosis, in infectious and inflammatory disease and cancer.

== Early life and education ==
Kanneganti is from Kothagudem, Telangana (United Andhra Pradesh), India. She received her undergraduate degree from Singareni Collieries Women's College, Kothagudem at Kakatiya University, where she majored in chemistry, zoology, and botany. She then received her M.Sc. and PhD from Osmania University in India.

== Career ==
Kanneganti began her career in research as a PhD student studying plant pathogens and fungal toxins. She then went on to do postdoctoral fellowships at the University of Wisconsin and the Ohio State University studying fungal genetics and plant innate immunity. She transitioned to study mammalian innate immunity at the University of Michigan. She joined St. Jude Children's Research Hospital as an Assistant Member in the Immunology Department in 2007, where she has focused on studying inflammasomes and cell death. She was promoted to a full Member in 2013. She became Vice Chair of the Immunology Department in 2016 and was endowed with the Rose Marie Thomas Endowed Chair in 2017. In 2022, she also became the Director of the Center of Excellence in Innate Immunity and Inflammation at St. Jude. Kanneganti is among the most "Highly Cited Researchers" in the world due to the noteworthy impact of her findings in the fields of innate immunity, inflammation, and cell death.

Kanneganti's early discoveries were foundational in the inflammasome field, providing the first genetic evidence for NLRP3 inflammasome activation in response to microbial components and live pathogens. Building on these discoveries, she and her research group have identified several critical innate immune sensors—including NLRP3, ZBP1, AIM2, NLRC5, and NLRP12 —that drive inflammatory cell death, and defined their upstream regulatory mechanisms. Their work on these molecules established new paradigms connecting innate immune sensing to cell death and disease, advancing our understanding of pathway regulation and coordination during infection and inflammation. These findings led Kanneganti to pioneer the paradigm-shifting concept of PANoptosis (inflammatory cell death), and this research has filled major gaps intersecting the fields of innate immunity, cell death, and inflammation.

== Awards and honors ==
- American Association of Immunology-BD Biosciences Investigator Award (2015)
- Vince Kidd Memorial Mentor of the Year Award (2015)
- Outstanding macrophage researcher Dolph O. Adams award, Society for Leukocyte Biology (2017)
- American Society for Microbiology Eli Lilly and Company-Elanco Research Award (2017)
- Interferon and Cytokine Research Seymour & Vivian Milstein Award for Excellence (2018)
- Clarivate/Web of Science list of Highly Cited Researchers (2017, 2018, 2019, 2020, 2021, 2022, 2023, 2024, 2025)
- R35 Outstanding Investigator Award, National Institutes of Health (2020)
- Fellow in the American Academy of Microbiology, American Society for Microbiology (2021)
- Outstanding Scientist Award, AAIS in Cancer Research (2022)
- Rosalind Franklin Society Special Award in Science (2022)
- Fellow in the American Association for the Advancement of Science (AAAS) (2022)
- American Association of Immunology - Thermo Fisher Meritorious Career Award (2024)

== Major contributions ==
=== The NLRP3 inflammasome, conceptualization of PANoptosis, discovery of PANoptosomes ===
Kanneganti has made discoveries elucidating the roles of innate immune receptors and inflammasomes, advancing the understanding of inflammation and inflammatory cell death. Her work has clarified the role of NLRP3 in inflammasome formation and has expanded the understanding of various inflammasome pathways. Her studies, along with those from other groups published in 2006, provided the first genetic evidence for the role of NLRP3 in the formation of the inflammasome, caspase-1 activation, and IL-1β/IL-18 maturation. These initial studies showed that microbial components, ATP, and MSU crystals activate the NLRP3 inflammasome.

Kanneganti discovered that Influenza A virus, Candida, and Aspergillus specifically activate the NLRP3 inflammasome and elucidated the physiological role of the NLRP3 inflammasome in host defense. Beyond infectious diseases, her lab also established the importance of the NLRP3 inflammasome in autoinflammatory diseases, intestinal inflammation, neuroinflammation, cancer, and metabolic diseases.

Kanneganti's lab has also worked on the upstream regulatory mechanisms of NLRP3 and inflammasome-induced inflammatory cell death, pyroptosis. Her lab identified caspase-8 and FADD as key regulators of the expression and activation regulators of both the canonical and non-canonical NLRP3 inflammasome and pyroptosis. Her group also characterized redundancies between caspase-1 and caspase-8 and between NLRP3 and caspase-8 in autoinflammatory disease and linked diet and the microbiome to these processes. These studies demonstrated that the NLRP3 inflammasomepathway is closely connected to caspase-8–mediated cell death. This finding went against the dogma that existed at that time that caspase-8 and FADD were involved only in apoptosis.

Following up on her original discovery that NLRP3 senses viral RNAs, her lab discovered Z-DNA binding protein 1 (ZBP1)/DAI as an innate immune sensor of influenza virus upstream of the NLRP3 inflammasome and cell death; however, this cell death was not consistent with any of the cell death pathways characterized at that time. This led Kanneganti to characterize ZBP1 as a regulator of PANoptosis, a prominent innate immune, inflammatory, and lytic cell death pathway initiated by innate immune sensors and driven by caspases and receptor-interacting protein kinases (RIPKs) through PANoptosomes. PANoptosomes are multi-protein complexes assembled by germline-encoded pattern-recognition receptor(s) (PRRs) (innate immune sensor(s)) in response to pathogens, including bacterial, viral, and fungal infections, as well as pathogen-associated molecular patterns, damage-associated molecular patterns, cytokines, and homeostatic changes during infections, inflammatory conditions, and cancer.

She then went on to establish that multiple PANoptosomes can contain different sensors and respond to different triggers:

- The ZBP1-PANoptosome responds to influenza virus infection.
- The RIPK1-PANoptosome responds to Yersinia infection and the inhibition of transforming growth factor beta-activated kinase 1 (TAK1), a molecule Kanneganti identified as a master regulator that maintains cellular homeostasis by negatively regulating the NLRP3 inflammasome and inflammatory cell death.
- The AIM2-PANoptosome responds to Francisella and herpes simplex virus 1 infections.
- The NLRP12-PANoptosome responds to the combination of heme and PAMPs or TNF.
- The NLRC5-PANoptosome responds to the combination of heme, PAMPS or TNF, as well as depletion of NAD+.
- The NLRP3-PANoptosome contains the NLRP3 inflammasome as an integral component and responds to canonical NLRP3 inflammasome stimuli.

Collectively, these studies identified ZBP1, AIM2, RIPK1, NLRC5/NLRP12, NLRP3, and caspase-8 as master molecular switches of inflammasome activation and PANoptosis. Additionally, her group discovered that interferon regulatory factor 1 (IRF1), a critical regulator of inflammation and cell death, regulates the activation of several PANoptosomes.

Overall, work from Kanneganti's lab has implicated PANoptosis in infectious, metabolic, hemolytic, neurologic, and autoinflammatory diseases and cancer.

=== Viral Infections ===
PANoptosis is implicated in driving innate immune responses and inflammation. Kanneganti's research group identified the ZBP1-PANoptosome as crucial for host defense during influenza A virus infections, revealing its role in promoting inflammatory cell death. Her lab also showed that coronavirus activates PANoptosis and that inhibiting the NLRP3 inflammasome or gasdermin D during coronavirus infection increases cell death and cytokine secretion rather than decreasing them. Kanneganti's lab demonstrated that the AIM2-PANoptosome is essential during herpes simplex virus 1 (HSV1) infections. Additional work in Kanneganti's lab focusing on beta-coronaviruses showed that IFN induces ZBP1-mediated PANoptosis, which causes morbidity and mortality. These findings led her team to suggest that inhibiting ZBP1 may improve the efficacy of IFN therapy for COVID-19 and impact other infectious and inflammatory diseases where IFNs cause pathology.

=== Bacterial Infections ===
Kanneganti has been at the forefront of exploring PANoptosis in bacterial infections. Her research identified the RIPK1-PANoptosome as a key player in Yersinia pseudotuberculosis infections. Additionally, her lab discovered that the AIM2-PANoptosome mediates PANoptosis during Francisella novicida infections Her work has extended to bacterial pathogens Salmonella enterica and Listeria monocytogenes, where the loss of caspases and RIPK3 offers protection against cell death. Her research group also recently discovered the role of NINJ1, a key executioner of inflammatory cell death, in mediating PANoptosis following heat stress and infection, thereby identifying NINJ1 and PANoptosis effectors as potential therapeutic targets.

=== Cancer ===
Beyond infectious disease and inflammatory syndromes, Kanneganti's group has also found that activating PANoptosis could be beneficial to eliminating cancer cells. Treatment of cancer cells with PANoptosis-inducing agents TNF and IFN-γ can reduce tumor size in preclinical models. Her group also discovered a regulatory relationship between ADAR1 and ZBP1 that can be targeted with the combination of nuclear export inhibitors, such as selinexor, and IFN to drive ZBP1-mediated PANoptosis and regress tumors in preclinical models.

=== Hematological disorders ===
Dr. Kanneganti's work has also revealed the role of PANoptosis in hematologic disorders. Her research identified that NLRC5- and NLRP12-mediated PANoptosis is activated by heme, which can be released during red blood cell lysis in infections or inflammatory diseases. The deletion of NLRP12 was shown to protect against pathology in animal models of hemolytic diseases, positioning NLRP12 as a potential therapeutic target. Additionally, her lab discovered the NLRC5-PANoptosome's response to NAD+ depletion, triggered by heme-containing stimuli, and demonstrated that NLRC5 deletion provides protection not only in hemolytic disease models but also in colitis and hemophagocytic lymphohistiocytosis (HLH) models.

=== Cytokine storm, signaling, and disease ===
Kanneganti's lab showed compensatory roles for NLRP3/caspase-1 and caspase-8 in the regulation of IL-1β production in osteomyelitis. Additionally, discoveries from her research group suggest that IL-1α and IL-1β can have distinct roles in driving inflammatory disease. She identified the role of the IL-1α and RIPK1/TAK1/SYK signaling pathways in skin inflammation. Furthermore, her studies also showed the role of another IL-1 family member, IL-33, in regulating immune responses and microbiota in the gut. Overall, Kanneganti's lab discovered distinct and previously unrecognized functions of the cytokines IL-1α, IL-1β, and IL-33 and their signaling pathways in inflammatory diseases and cancer.

Beyond her studies on IL-1 family members, her recent work on cytokine storm established TNF and IFN-γ as the key upstream cytokines that cause inflammatory cell death (PANoptosis), tissue and organ damage, and mortality, and she has suggested that strategies to target these cytokines or other molecules in their signaling pathway should be evaluated as therapeutic strategies in COVID-19, sepsis, and other diseases associated with cytokine storm.
