= Pathophysiology of HIV/AIDS =

Disease pathology and physiology

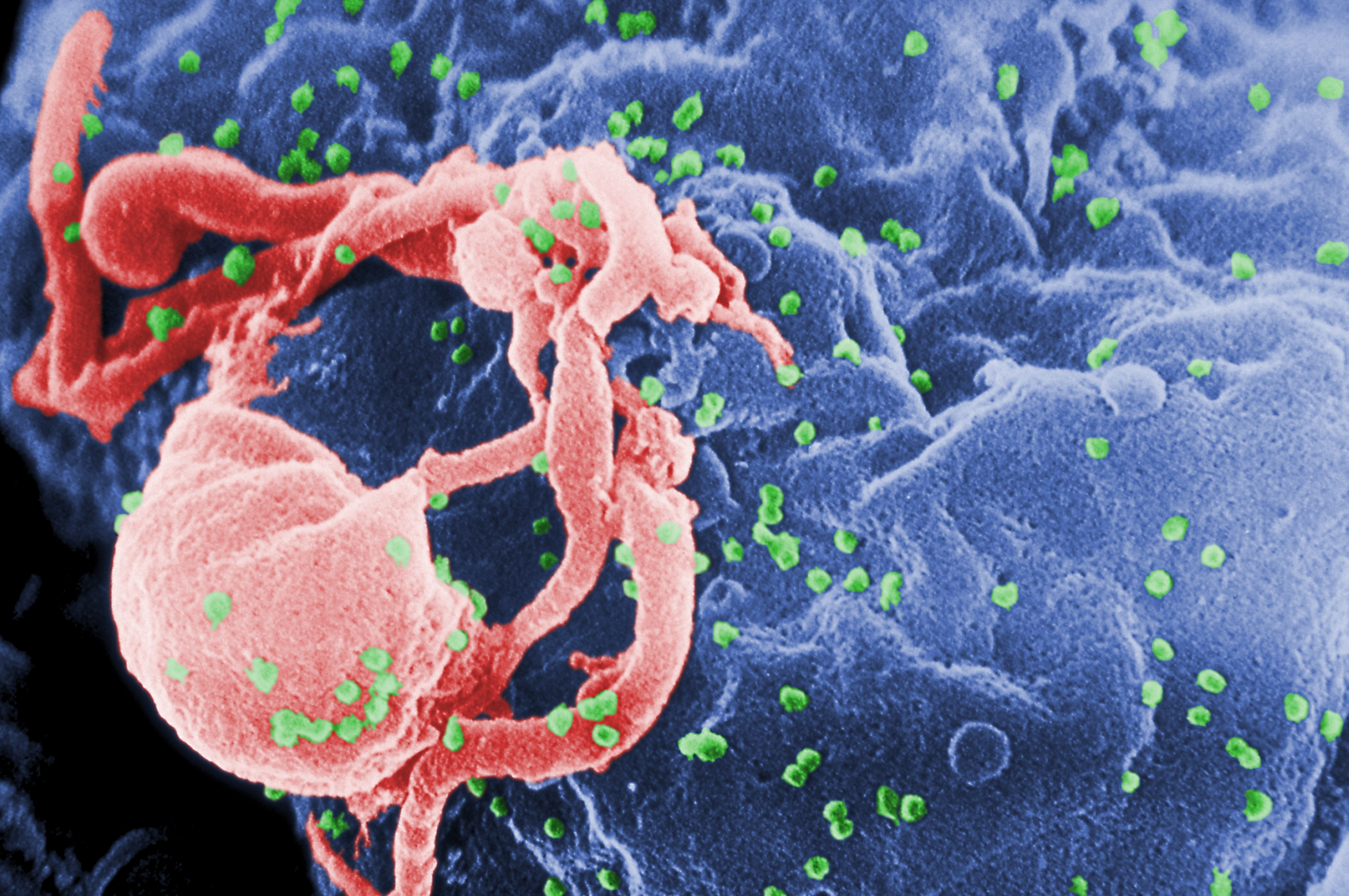
- HIV budding color
- Biological system: Immune system

HIV is commonly transmitted via unprotected sexual activity, blood transfusions, hypodermic needles, and from mother to child. Upon acquisition of the virus, the virus replicates inside and kills T helper cells, which are required for almost all adaptive immune responses. There is an initial period of influenza-like illness, and then a latent, asymptomatic phase. When the CD4 lymphocyte count falls below 200 cells/ml of blood, the HIV host has progressed to AIDS, a condition characterized by deficiency in cell-mediated immunity and the resulting increased susceptibility to opportunistic infections and certain forms of cancer.

== Immunology ==
After the virus enters the body there is a period of rapid viral replication, leading to an abundance of virus in the peripheral blood. During primary infection, the level of HIV may reach several million virus particles per milliliter of blood.

This response is accompanied by a marked drop in the numbers of circulating CD4^{+} T cells. This acute viremia is associated in virtually all people with the activation of CD8^{+} T cells, which kill HIV-infected cells, and subsequently with antibody production, or seroconversion. The CD8^{+} T cell response is thought to be important in controlling virus levels, which peak and then decline, as the CD4^{+} T cell counts rebound. A good CD8^{+} T cell response has been linked to slower disease progression and a better prognosis, though it does not eliminate the virus.

During the acute phase, HIV-induced cell lysis and killing of infected cells by cytotoxic T cells accounts for CD4^{+} T cell depletion, although apoptosis may also be a factor. During the chronic phase, the consequences of generalized immune activation coupled with the gradual loss of the ability of the immune system to generate new T cells appear to account for the slow decline in CD4^{+} T cell numbers.

Although the symptoms of immunodeficiency (characteristic of AIDS) do not appear for years after a person is infected, the bulk of CD4^{+} T cell loss occurs during the first weeks of infection, especially in the intestinal mucosa, which harbors the majority of the lymphocytes found in the body. The reason for the preferential loss of mucosal CD4^{+} T cells is that a majority of mucosal CD4^{+} T cells express the CCR5 coreceptor, whereas a small fraction of CD4^{+} T cells in the bloodstream do so.

HIV seeks out and destroys CCR5 expressing CD4^{+} cells during acute infection. A vigorous immune response eventually controls the infection and initiates the clinically latent phase. However, CD4^{+} T cells in mucosal tissues remain depleted throughout the infection, although enough remain to initially ward off life-threatening infections.

Continuous HIV replication results in a state of generalized immune activation persisting throughout the chronic phase. Immune activation, which is reflected by the increased activation state of immune cells and release of proinflammatory cytokines, results from the activity of several HIV gene products and the immune response to ongoing HIV replication. Another cause is the breakdown of the immune surveillance system of the mucosal barrier caused by the depletion of mucosal CD4^{+} T cells during the acute phase of disease.

This results in the systemic exposure of the immune system to microbial components of the gut’s normal flora, which in a healthy person is kept in check by the mucosal immune system. The activation and proliferation of T cells that results from immune activation provides fresh targets for HIV infection. However, direct killing by HIV alone cannot account for the observed depletion of CD4^{+} T cells since only 0.01–0.10% of CD4^{+} T cells in the blood are infected.

A major cause of CD4^{+} T cell loss appears to result from their heightened susceptibility to apoptosis when the immune system remains activated. Although new T cells are continuously produced by the thymus to replace the ones lost, the regenerative capacity of the thymus is slowly destroyed by direct infection of its thymocytes by HIV. Eventually, the minimal number of CD4^{+} T cells necessary to maintain a sufficient immune response is lost, leading to AIDS.

== CD4 T-cell death and inflammation ==
Recent studies employed an ex vivo human lymphoid aggregate culture (HLAC) system formed with fresh human tonsil or spleen tissue to model molecular and cellular events in human tissues during in vivo HIV infection. These studies found that >95% of CD4 T cells die because of abortive HIV infection. These dying cells are resting and thus are nonpermissive for productive HIV infection. Full viral replication was limited to the ~5% of activated CD4 T cells present in these tissues; these cells die by apoptosis. Abortive HIV infection occurs due to slowing of reverse transcription promoting cytosolic DNA accumulation. This viral DNA is sensed by gamma-interferon-inducible protein 16 (IFI16), which produces an innate immune response against the virus by activating caspase 1 in IFI16 inflammasomes and inducing pyroptosis, a highly inflammatory form of programmed cell death. These findings cast CD4 T-cell death during HIV infection in a different light. Rather than the virus playing a major role, it is the host response to viral DNA produced during abortive infection that triggers CD4 T-cell death. Further, these findings identify novel drug targets that may be exploited to both block CD4 T cell demise and the chronic inflammatory response generated during pyroptosis.

== Cells affected ==
The virus, entering through which ever route, acts primarily on the following cells:

- Lymphoreticular system:
  - CD_{4}+ T-Helper cells (main target cell)
  - Macrophages
  - Monocytes
- Certain endothelial cells
- Central nervous system:
  - Microglia of the nervous system
  - Astrocytes
  - Oligodendrocytes
  - Neurones – indirectly by the action of cytokines and the gp-120

== The effect ==
Although the virus has cytopathic effects in productively infected cells, this effect may not directly contribute to HIV pathogenesis (see above). Importantly, the virus can remain inactive (latent) in these productively infected cells for long periods.

- CD4 T-cell depletion and chronic inflammation are the two signature events that drive HIV pathogenesis and progression to AIDS.
- Infection of the cells of the CNS cause acute aseptic meningitis, subacute encephalitis, vacuolar myelopathy and peripheral neuropathy. Later it leads to even AIDS dementia complex.
- The CD_{4}-gp120 interaction (see above) is also permissive to other viruses like Cytomegalovirus, Hepatitis virus, Herpes simplex virus, etc. These viruses lead to further cell damage i. e. cytopathy.

== See also ==
- Structure and genome of HIV
- HIV replication cycle
- HIV tropism
