= Inflammasome =

Cytosolic multiprotein complex that mediates the activation of Caspase 1

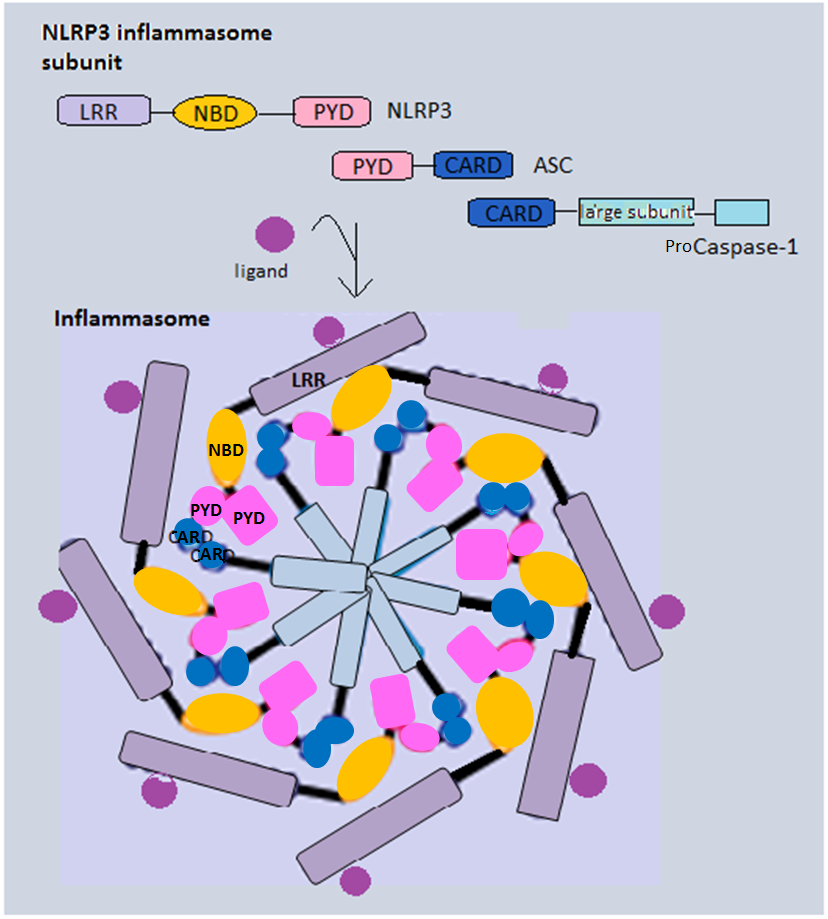
Diagram of an Inflammasome

Inflammasomes are cytosolic multiprotein complexes of the innate immune system responsible for the activation of inflammatory responses and cell death. They are formed as a result of specific cytosolic pattern recognition receptors (PRRs), which are molecular sensors of microbe-derived pathogen-associated molecular patterns (PAMPs), damage-associated molecular patterns (DAMPs) from the host cell, or homeostatic disruptions. Activation and assembly of the inflammasome promotes the activation of caspase-1, which then proteolytically cleaves pro-inflammatory cytokines, interleukin 1β (IL-1β) and interleukin 18 (IL-18), as well as the pore-forming molecule gasdermin D (GSDMD). The N-terminal GSDMD fragment resulting from this cleavage induces a pro-inflammatory form of programmed cell death distinct from apoptosis, referred to as pyroptosis, which is responsible for the release of mature cytokines. Additionally, inflammasomes can act as integral components of larger cell death-inducing complexes called PANoptosomes, which drive another distinct form of pro-inflammatory cell death called PANoptosis.

Inflammasome formation is driven by germline-encoded PRRs, including NLRs (nucleotide-binding oligomerization domain and leucine-rich repeat-containing receptors), AIM2 (absent in melanoma 2), IFI16 (IFN-inducible protein 16), and pyrin. Through their caspase activation and recruitment domain (CARD) or pyrin domain (PYD), the PRRs interact with the adaptor protein called apoptosis-associated speck like protein containing a CARD (also known as ASC or Pycard), which then recruits pro-caspase-1 via its CARD domain to activate inflammatory signaling and pyroptotic cell death. Notably, the PYD of the adaptor protein ASC has been demonstrated to function as a prion-like domain, forming a self-perpetuating polymer when activated. In addition to inflammasomes activating caspase-1, several studies also described non-canonical inflammasome complexes that act independently from caspase-1. In mice, the non-canonical inflammasome is activated by direct sensing of cytosolic bacterial lipopolysaccharide (LPS) by caspase-11, which subsequently induces pyroptotic cell death. In human cells, the corresponding caspases of the non-canonical inflammasome are caspase 4 and caspase 5.

Traditionally, inflammasomes have mainly been studied in professional innate immune cells, such as macrophages. However, recent studies indicate high levels of inflammasome component expression in epithelial barrier tissues, where they have been demonstrated to serve as an important first line of defense. Moreover, the dysregulation of inflammasome activation can contribute to the pathology of several major diseases, including cancer, autoimmune disorders, inflammatory conditions, metabolic disorders, and neurodegenerative diseases.

== Discovery ==
The inflammasome was discovered by the team of Jürg Tschopp, at the University of Lausanne, in 2002. In 2002, it was first reported by Martinon et al. that NLRP1 (NLR family PYD-containing 1) could assemble and oligomerize into a structure in vitro, which activated the caspase-1 cascade, thereby leading to the production of pro-inflammatory cytokines, including IL-1β and IL-18. This NLRP1 multi-molecular complex was dubbed the 'inflammasome', generating significant interest in the following years. During that time, several other inflammasomes were discovered, two of which are also driven by NLRs—NLRP3 (NLR family PYD-containing 3) and NLRC4 (NLR family CARD-containing 4). The physiological relevance of the inflammasome was identified in 2006, when three teams defined the inflammasome's role in diseases such as infection, exposure to toxins, gout, and type 2 diabetes. Several PAMPs, DAMPs, and other activators, including bacterial RNA and imidazoquinolines, viral DNA, muramyl dipeptide (MDP), asbestos, and silica, were found to induce an inflammasome response. Additional links were also found between metabolic syndrome and NLRP3, one of the inflammasome sensors. These findings paved the way for present-day studies in the fields of innate immunity and cell death, in which disease mechanisms and treatments are being investigated in relation to inflammasome assembly and activation.

Inflammasomes can also be formed by PRRs other than NLR proteins. In 2009, Hornung et al. identified a PYHIN (pyrin and HIN domain-containing protein) known as AIM2 that assembles an inflammasome in response to foreign cytoplasmic double-stranded DNA (dsDNA), which several other groups also confirmed in back-to-back studies with Hornung et al. Since then, other non-NLR inflammasome sensors have also been identified.

== Inflammation activation ==
Assembly of the inflammasome and the resulting inflammatory signaling cascade involve a well-orchestrated mechanism comprising upstream sensors, adapters, and downstream effectors. Inflammasomes play a crucial role in innate immunity via PRR activation in response to an array of stimuli, such as infectious triggers (including bacteria, fungi, viruses, and parasites) and sterile triggers (including ion flux, mitochondrial dysfunction, ROS, and metabolic factors).

Canonical inflammasomes are assembled by the NLRs (including NLRP1, NLRP3, NLRC4), AIM2, and pyrin by recruiting pro-caspase-1 (the precursor molecule of caspase-1), with or without the ASC adaptor.^{[} In its complete state, the inflammasome appositions together many p45 pro-caspase-1 molecules, inducing their autocatalytic cleavage into p20 and p10 subunits. Caspase-1 then assembles into its active form, which consists of two heterodimers, including a p20 and p10 subunit each.

Caspase-1 activation facilitates the maturation of the inflammatory cytokines IL-1β and IL-18 and the activation by cleavage of GSDMD. GSDMD forms pores in the plasma membrane that release mature IL-1β and may result in pyroptosis, in which the cell bursts and induces further pro-inflammatory signaling. The released IL-1β and IL-18 induce interferon gamma (IFN-γ) secretion and natural killer cell activation, inactivation of IL-33, DNA fragmentation and cell pore formation, inhibition of glycolytic enzymes, activation of lipid biosynthesis, and secretion of tissue-repair mediators such as pro-IL-1α. While NLRP1, NLRP3, NLRC4, AIM2, and pyrin are the most well-characterized sensors, IFI16, NLRP6, NLRP7, NLRP9b, NLRP10, NLRP12, and CARD8 also play important roles in inflammasome activation and signaling.

The non-canonical inflammasomes are assembled by caspase-11 (caspases−4 and -5 in humans). Caspases-11, -4 or -5 can then cleave GSDMD to induce pyroptosis or activation of the NLRP3 inflammasome complex.

== Inflammasome family ==
The inflammasome sensors are categorized based on their structural characteristics into nucleotide-binding domain–like receptors (NLRs), absent in melanoma 2–like receptors (ALRs) and pyrin. These receptors possess the ability to form inflammasomes and trigger caspase-1 activation. The NLR family can be classified either as NLRP or NLRC subfamilies depending on whether the N terminus contains a PYD or CARD, respectively. Specific proteins, such as NLRP1, NLRP3, and NLRC4, have been mainly recognized as NLRs that can assemble an inflammasome, whereas others, such as NLRP6, NLRP12, and so on are regarded as context-dependent inflammasome sensors.

=== NLR-based inflammasomes ===
NLRP1, NLRP3, and NLRC4 are members of the NLR family and are characterized by two common features: the first is a nucleotide-binding oligomerization domain (NOD), which can bind ribonucleotide-phosphates (rNTP) and plays an important role in self-oligomerization. The second is a C-terminal leucine-rich repeat (LRR), which can function as a ligand-recognition domain for other receptors (e.g. TLR) or microbial ligands in some cases. NLRP1 is most highly expressed in epithelial barriers (including keratinocytes and bronchial epithelial cells); NLRP3 in myeloid cells (monocytes, macrophages, neutrophils, and dendritic cells); and NLRC4 in myeloid cells, astrocytes, and intestinal epithelial cells, among other cell types. Inflammasome components and functional inflammasomes have also been identified in lymphocytes.

==== NLRP1 inflammasome ====
The NLRP1 inflammasome was the first to be identified and studied extensively. In addition to NOD and LRR, the NLRP1 structure consists of a PYD at its N-terminal, a FIIND motif, and a CARD at its C-terminus, which helps distinguish it from the other inflammasome sensors. While only one NLRP1 protein is present in humans, there are three paralogs of Nlrp1 (NLRP1A, B, C) in the mouse genome, and the murine NLRP1B inflammasome can be formed by recruitment of caspase-1 either with or without ASC. The recruitment and cleavage of pro-caspase-1 can then activate the downstream caspase-1-mediated pathways.

Various stimuli have been linked to the activation of NLRP1. NLRP1B in mice and NLRP2 in rats were found to be responsive to Bacillus anthracis lethal toxin. The B. anthracis lethal factor proteolytically cleaves NLRP1B, resulting in ubiquitination of the receptor and degradation by the proteasome. This degradation generates a clipped C-terminal fragment, which subsequently binds to the rest of the protein in a non-covalent manner. During this step, the CARD on the C-terminal fragment becomes accessible for inflammasome assembly. So far, this activation mechanism based on proteasome degradation is unique to this inflammasome. NLRP1 activity is regulated by the anti-apoptotic proteins Bcl-2 and Bcl-x(L) which, in resting cells, associate with and inhibit NLRP1 activity.

==== NLRP3 inflammasome ====
NLRP3 is one of the best-researched inflammasome sensors. The NLRP3 structure consists of PYD along with the NOD and LRR domains. It triggers caspase-1 activation by using PYD to recruit ASC and form a single oligomer in each cell, which includes ten NLRP3 molecules in humans. NLRP3 has been recognized as the largest inflammasome, with a diameter of around 1–2 μm.

NLRP3 oligomerization is activated by a large number of diverse stimuli, such as DAMPs, including crystalline matter (e.g., monosodium urate (MSU) crystals), alum, asbestos, calcium influx, mitochondrial reactive oxygen species (ROS), and extracellular ATP. The NLRP3 inflammasome is additionally known to assemble in response to PAMPs from pathogens including viruses such as influenza A, bacteria such as Neisseria gonorrhoeae^{[30]} and bacterial toxins such as nigericin and maitotoxin, and fungi such as Aspergillus fumigatus.

Many NLRP3 activators induce cytosolic potassium efflux from cells, and a sufficiently low cytosolic potassium concentration can trigger NLRP3 activation in the absence of other stimuli. However, NLRP3 inflammasome activation can also occur independently from potassium efflux by employing small molecules that target mitochondria or through other mechanisms. Additionally, cholesterol and MSU crystals activate the NLRP3 inflammasome, leading to increased IL-1β-production. This process is thought to be abrogated in atherosclerosis and gout, where these crystals accumulate within the cell. It has also been established that inorganic particles like titanium dioxide, silicon dioxide, and asbestos can activate the inflammasome^{.} While the activation of the NLRP3 inflammasome leads to a potent inflammatory response to various pathogens and stress signals, it has also been reported that NLRP3 inflammasome activation may play a role in sleep regulation^{.} Additionally, recent studies indicate that NLRP3 inflammasome-mediated neuroinflammation is involved in secondary brain injury following intracerebral hemorrhage.

The NLRP3 inflammasome is also an essential component of several PANoptosomes, including the ZBP1-, RIPK1-, and NLRP12-PANoptosome.

==== NAIP/NLRC4 inflammasome ====
NLRC4 is the only member of the NLRC family currently known to assemble an inflammasome (although NLRC5 can assemble a PANoptosome). NLRC4 consists of a CARD along with the NOD and LRR domains to directly recruit the adaptor protein ASC, or pro-caspase-1. The NLR family apoptosis inhibitory proteins, or NAIPs, are crucial for serving as a sensor to facilitate the activation of the NLRC4 inflammasome.

The NAIP/NLRC4 inflammasome is involved in host defense against several pathogens. In mice, NAIPs are activated by binding to the bacterial PAMPs in the cytosol, which are provided by the rod (NAIP2) and needle (NAIP1) components of the bacterial type-3 secretion system (T3SS), as well as flagellin, the molecular building block of flagella (NAIP5 and -6). Humans have a single NAIP that specifically responds to the needle component. Following ligand binding, NAIPs interact with NLRC4 to initiate the assembly of the NLRC4 inflammasome, which then recruits and activates pro-caspase-1 via its CARD. Experimental evidence demonstrates that palmitate may induce the NLRC4 inflammasome in the absence of bacteria.

The NLRC4 inflammasome is a well-documented epithelial inflammasome that is crucial in limiting intraepithelial bacterial populations during the early stages of enterobacterial infections such as Salmonella and Citrobacter rodentium. Intracellular bacteria activate the inflammasome, resulting in the targeted expulsion of infected epithelial cells from the epithelium to reduce the bacterial load. This process, known as epithelial cell extrusion, occurs without compromising the integrity of the epithelial barrier. Furthermore, the NLRC4 inflammasome was found to reduce tumor load in a mouse model of colorectal carcinoma (CRC) by triggering the elimination of tumor-initiating cells.

=== Non-NLR-based inflammasomes ===
AIM2, pyrin, IFI16, and others are non-NLR sensors that form inflammasomes.

==== AIM2 inflammasome ====
The AIM2 inflammasome forms in response to cytosolic dsDNA and plays a crucial role in host defense against DNA viruses and intracellular bacterial infections. AIM2 consists of an N-terminal PYD and a C-terminal HIN domain. Both domains interact to maintain the molecule in an auto-inhibited state. Binding of dsDNA results in the release of auto-inhibition, which leads to the formation of AIM2 oligomers. These oligomers then recruit the adaptor ASC through contacts between their PYDs, which is required for the AIM2 inflammasome assembly and activation. As a result, pro-caspase-1 is recruited to the inflammasome complex, triggering a robust innate immune response and pyroptotic cell death.

AIM2 is mainly expressed in intestinal and lymphoid tissue and in cell types such as B-cells, plasma cells, late spermatids, early spermatids, and Schwann cells. AIM2 plays an essential role in inflammation, autoimmune diseases, cancer, and host defense against infections via inflammasome-dependent and -independent pathways. In addition, the AIM2 inflammasome also acts as an integral component of the AIM2-PANoptosome complex with pyrin and ZBP1 to promote PANoptosis and host defense in response to F. novicida and HSV1.

==== IFI16 inflammasome ====
Like AIM2, IFI16 (IFN-inducible protein 16) belongs to the PYHIN family. IFI16 in humans, and the mouse orthologue IFI204, plays an important role in regulating the production of IFN upon bacterial and viral infections. Unlike AIM2, IFI16 is a nuclear DNA sensor. Upon sensing viral DNAs, IFI16 recruits caspase-1 by interacting with ASC, resulting in death of CD4^{+} T cells in response to HIV infection.

==== Pyrin inflammasome ====
Pyrin is an innate immune sensor that coordinates the assembly of the inflammasome in response to bacterial toxins as well as effector proteins via the detection of pathogen-driven alterations in cytoskeleton dynamics. Pyrin expression is specific to the cells of the innate immune system, including granulocytes, eosinophils, monocytes, and dendritic cells. Pyrin particularly detects the inactivation of the Rho GTPase RHOA by bacterial factors. Upon RHOA inactivation, pyrin engages in a homotypic association with ASC via its N-terminal PYD, leading to the formation of micrometer-sized assemblies known as ASC specks by oligomerization, finally resulting in the activation of caspase-1. This results in the release of inflammatory cytokines, including IL-1β.

=== Non-canonical inflammasomes ===
The non-canonical inflammasomes are independent of caspase-1 and activate caspase-11 in mice, and caspase-4 and -5 in humans upon sensing intracellular LPS, a prototypic PAMP that plays a significant role in sepsis and septic shock. This initiates pyroptotic cell death by the cleavage of the pore-forming protein GSDMD leading to the secondary activation of the canonical NLRP3 inflammasome and cytokine release.

The primary function of the non-canonical inflammasome is to aid in the defense against Gram-negative bacteria, as well as eliminate pathogens and alert neighboring cells by releasing alarmins, DAMPs, and canonical NLRP3 inflammasome-dependent cytokines. However, the effects of canonical and non-canonical inflammasome activation are similar.

In addition to LPS, there is evidence suggesting that certain other triggers can alternatively activate the non-canonical inflammasome (via caspase-11). The non-canonical inflammasome plays key roles in endotoxemia and sepsis, making its components valuable targets for clinical intervention.

== Role in health ==
=== Role in innate immunity ===
Inflammasomes are crucial components of the innate immune system that initiate inflammatory responses and regulate host defenses by activating and releasing pro-inflammatory cytokines and inducing pyroptosis. Inflammasomes and their components are also involved in executing PANoptosis, which is another form of innate immune inflammatory lytic cell death.

In addition to specialized innate immune cells such as macrophages, several studies have examined various epithelial inflammasomes and emphasized their role in immune defense. Epithelia not only act as a physical barrier but also initiate a defensive response upon initial contact with pathogens. Various inflammasome components were found to be ex pressed in various epithelial tissues. The expression of innate immune components at epithelial barriers facilitates pathogen detection, as the expression of virulence factors and the exposure of PAMPs is required for breaching these barriers upon pathogen invasion. However, these factors may be downregulated when the pathogen interacts with professional immune cells at later stages of the infection. Research on epithelial inflammasomes has been largely focused on the intestinal mucosa. Inflammasomes have also been identified in other tissues, such as the urinary bladder epithelium.

Murine caspase-11 is mainly expressed in macrophages, while human caspase-4 is highly expressed in intestinal epithelial cells. Human epithelial cells exhibit caspase-4-dependent, caspase-1-independent cell death and extrusion when infected with enteropathogens such as Salmonella, Shigella flexneri, or Escherichia coli, similar to the observations for the epithelial NAIP/NLRC4 inflammasome. Furthermore, IL-18 production can be triggered by cytosolic LPS in epithelial cells.

The activation of epithelial inflammasomes in response to invading pathogens has significant cell-autonomous effects on the infected cell as well as on its communication with other cell types on a local and global level. The downstream consequences of inflammasome activation can be categorized into three groups: (1) epithelial cell death, (2) release of soluble pro-inflammatory molecules, and (3) effector cell recruitment and activation. In addition, epithelial inflammasome activation induces contraction of epithelial layers and maintains integrity during later stages of infection.

The activation of the inflammasome in the epithelial barrier needs to be precisely balanced to eliminate infected cells while also preserving the integrity of the barrier. Inflammasome activation can trigger epithelial cell death in a direct, cell-autonomous manner, as well as local recruitment of other death-inducing cell types, or inflammation, resulting in enhanced epithelial turnover that eliminates both infected and uninfected cells. Neutrophils, along with NK and mast cells, are crucial innate immune effector cells that infiltrate infected tissue after pathogens breach epithelial barriers. They immobilize and eliminate pathogens, secrete inflammatory mediators like IFN-γ and IL-22, and eliminate microorganisms trapped within pyroptotic macrophages.

Inflammasome-dependent IL-1β and IL-18 release recruit effector cells, orchestrating the innate immune response. IL-1β production is modest by intestinal epithelial cells, while IL-18 secreted can induce IFN-γ production by several cell types. IL-18, derived from the inflammasome, aids in the early stages of innate immune responses by recruiting natural killer cells, stimulating their effector functions, and secreting IFN-γ to recruit other inflammatory cells.

A study on urinary bladder epithelium infection found high levels of IL-1β secretion by epithelial cells, influenced by the NLRP3 inflammasome and caspase-1, which recruits mast cells and induces lytic cell death.

=== Role in disease ===
Inflammasomes play significant roles in the development or progression of pathologies that have a substantial impact on public health, such as inflammatory conditions (liver diseases, inflammatory bowel diseases, and rheumatoid arthritis), metabolic disorders (obesity, type 2 diabetes, and atherosclerosis), cardiovascular diseases (ischemic and non-ischemic heart disease), neurological disorders (Parkinson's disease, Alzheimer's disease, multiple sclerosis, amyotrophic lateral sclerosis, and other neurological disorders), and cancer.

Gain-of-function mutations in NLRP3 are also known to cause cryopyrin-associated periodic syndrome (CAPS), a group of NLRP3 inflammasome-mediated congenital diseases characterized by IL-1β-mediated systemic inflammation. However, in certain circumstances, inflammasome signaling is beneficial in infections and can also impede tumor growth. The tumor-suppressive effect of the NLRP3, AIM2, and NLRC4 inflammasomes is widely recognized.

== Clinical significance ==
Several agents, including anakinra, canakinumab, rilonacept, and IL-18–binding protein, have been developed to treat autoinflammatory diseases like CAPS and other conditions where inflammasomes can be hyperactivated. These agents target the downstream effectors of inflammasome activation, namely IL-1β and IL-18. The involvement of the NLRP3 inflammasome specifically in several diseases has accelerated the discovery of efficient NLRP3 inhibitors.^{.} However, despite these advances, no specific NLR inhibitors for clinical use have been approved by the FDA to date.

== See also ==
- Selnoflast
- Neuroinflammation
- Parkinson's disease
- Innate immune system
- Interleukin-1β
- Caspase-1
