= PANoptosis =

Inflammatory cell death pathway

PANoptosis is a prominent innate immune, inflammatory, and lytic cell death pathway initiated by innate immune sensors and driven by caspases and receptor-interacting protein kinases (RIPKs) through multiprotein PANoptosome complexes. The assembly of the PANoptosome cell death complex occurs in response to germline-encoded pattern-recognition receptors (PRRs) sensing pathogens, including bacterial, viral, and fungal infections, as well as pathogen-associated molecular patterns, damage-associated molecular patterns, and cytokines that are released during infections, inflammatory conditions, and cancer. Several PANoptosome complexes, such as the ZBP1-, AIM2-, RIPK1-, NLRP3 and NLRC5- and NLRP12-PANoptosomes, have been characterized so far.

Emerging genetic, molecular, and biochemical studies have identified extensive crosstalk among the molecular components across various cell death pathways in response to a variety of pathogens and innate immune triggers. Historically, inflammatory caspase-mediated pyroptosis and RIPK-driven necroptosis were described as two major inflammatory cell death pathways. While the PANoptosis pathway has some molecular components in common with pyroptosis and necroptosis, as well as with the non-lytic apoptosis pathway, these mechanisms are separate processes that are associated with distinct triggers, protein complexes, and execution pathways. Inflammasome-dependent pyroptosis involves inflammatory caspases, including caspase-1 and caspase-11 in mice, and caspases-1, -4, and -5 in humans, and is executed by gasdermin D. In contrast, necroptosis occurs via RIPK1/3-mediated MLKL activation, which is downstream of caspase-8 inhibition. On the other hand, PANoptosis is [TDK1] driven by caspases and RIPKs and is executed by gasdermins, MLKL, NINJ1, and potentially other yet to be identified molecules cleaved by caspases. Moreover, caspase-8 is essential for cell death in PANoptosis but needs to be inactivated or inhibited to induce necroptosis.

Summary of the different morphologies, mechanisms and outcomes of apoptosis, pyroptosis, necroptosis, and PANoptosis

	Characteristics	Apoptosis	Pyroptosis	Necroptosis	PANoptosis
Morphology	Cell lysis	No	Yes	Yes	Yes
Morphology	Pore formation	No	Yes	Yes	Yes
Mechanism	Caspase activation	Yes	Yes	No	Yes
Mechanism	Gasdermin activation	No	Yes	No	Yes
Mechanism	RIPK1	Yes	No	Yes	Yes
Mechanism	RIPK3	No	No	Yes	Yes
Outcome	IL-1b and IL-18 release	No	Yes	No	Possible
Outcome	DAMP release	No	Yes	Yes	Yes
Outcome	Inflammation	No	Yes	Yes	Yes
Outcome	Programmed cell death	Yes	Yes	Yes	Yes

== Disease Relevance ==
Activation of PANoptosis can support host defense by clearing damaged and infected cells. Additionally, PANoptosis has been implicated in inflammatory diseases, neurological diseases, and cancer.

=== Viral Infections ===
PANoptosis has now been identified in a variety of infections, including influenza A virus, herpes simplex virus 1 (HSV1), and coronavirus. For example, PANoptosis is important for host defense during influenza infection through the ZBP1-PANoptosome and during HSV1 infections through the AIM2-PANoptosome. Studies with beta-coronaviruses have shown that IFN can induce ZBP1-mediated PANoptosis during SARS-CoV-2 infection, thereby limiting the efficacy of IFN treatment during infection and resulting in morbidity and mortality. This suggests that inhibiting ZBP1 may improve the therapeutic efficacy of IFN therapy during SARS-CoV-2 infection and possibly other inflammatory conditions where IFN-mediated cell death and pathology occur.

=== Bacterial Infections ===
In Yersinia pseudotuberculosis infections, PANoptosis is induced through the RIPK1-PANoptosome, and the deletion of caspase-8 and RIPK3 prevents cell death. During Francisella novicida infection, PANoptosis occurs through the AIM2-PANoptosome. PANoptosis has also been observed in Salmonella enterica and Listeria monocytogenes infections, where the combined loss of caspases and RIPK3 significantly protects cells from death.

=== Fungal Infections ===
PANoptosis also occurs in fungal infections, including those caused by Candida albicans and Aspergillus fumigatus.

=== Cancer ===
Treatment of cancer cells with the PANoptosis-inducing agents TNF and IFN-γ can reduce tumor size in preclinical models. The combination of the nuclear export inhibitor selinexor and IFN can also cause PANoptosis and regress tumors in preclinical models.

=== Hematologic disorders ===
More recent evidence suggests that NLRC5- NLRP12-mediated PANoptosis is activated by heme, which can be released by red blood cell lysis during infection or inflammatory disease, in combination with specific components of infection or cellular damage. Deletion of NLRP12 protects against pathology in animal models of hemolytic disease, suggesting this could also act as a therapeutic target. Similarly, the NLRC5-PANoptosome, which also contains NLRP12, was identified as a response to NAD+ depletion downstream of heme-containing triggers. Deletion of NLRC5 protects against not only hemolytic disease models, but also colitis and HLH models.

=== Fever ===
Additionally, PANoptosis can be induced by heat stress (HS), such as fever, during infection, and NINJ1 is a key executioner in this context. Deletion of NINJ1 in a murine model of HS and infection reduces mortality; furthermore, deleting essential PANoptosis effectors upstream completely rescues the mice from mortality, thereby identifying NINJ1 and PANoptosis effectors as potential therapeutic targets.

== Therapeutic Potential ==
The regulation of PANoptosis involves numerous PANoptosomes, which include multiple sensor molecules such as NLRP3, ZBP1, AIM2, NLRC5, and NLRP12, along with complex-forming molecules such as caspases and RIPKs. These components activate various downstream cell death executioners and play a role in disease. Therefore, modulating the components of this pathway has potential for therapy. However, excessive activation of PANoptosis can lead to inflammation, inflammatory disease, and cytokine storm syndromes. Treatments that block TNF and IFN-γ to prevent PANoptosis have provided therapeutic benefit in preclinical models of cytokine storm syndromes, including cytokine shock, SARS-CoV-2 infection, sepsis, and hemophagocytic lymphohistiocytosis, suggesting the therapeutic potential of modulating this pathway.
