= Kanneganti =

Kanneganti (Telugu: కన్నెగంటి) is a Telugu surname. Notable people with the surname include:

- Kanneganti Brahmandanam (born 1956), Indian actor and comedian mononymously known as Brahmanandam
- Kanneganti Hanumanthu (1870–1922), Indian activist
- Lalitha Kanneganti (born 1971), Indian judge
- Thirumala-Devi Kanneganti (born 1972), Indian-American immunologist
