= ZBP1 =

Protein-coding gene in the species Homo sapiens

Identifiers
- Aliases: ZBP1, C20orf183, DAI, DLM-1, DLM1, Z-DNA binding protein 1
- External IDs: OMIM: 606750; MGI: 1927449; GeneCards: ZBP1
Available structures
PDB	Ortholog search: PDBe RCSB
PDB	List of PDB id codes 2L4M, 2LNB, 3EYI, 4KA4

Gene location (Human)
Chr.	Chromosome 20 (human)
Band	20q13.31	Start	57,603,846 bp
Band	20q13.31	End	57,620,576 bp

Gene location (Mouse)
Chr.	Chromosome 2 (mouse)
Band	2|2 H3	Start	173,048,405 bp
Band	2|2 H3	End	173,060,716 bp
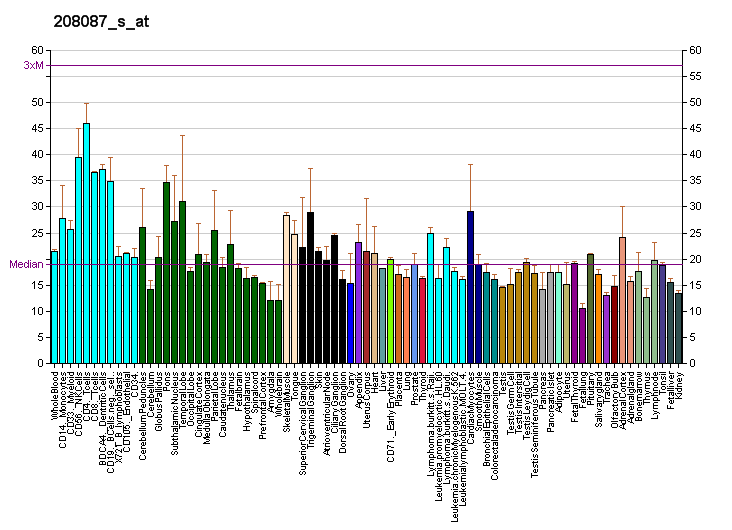
RNA expression pattern
Bgee	Human / Mouse (ortholog); Top expressed in: granulocyte; buccal mucosa cell; blood; spleen; monocyte; lymph node; bone marrow cell; appendix; rectum; gallbladder / Top expressed in: mucous cell of stomach; jejunum; thymus; granulocyte; intestinal villus; duodenum; blood; subcutaneous adipose tissue; mesenteric lymph nodes; spleen; More reference expression data
BioGPS	More reference expression data
Gene ontology
Molecular function	DNA binding; double-stranded RNA adenosine deaminase activity; protein binding; left-handed Z-DNA binding; RNA binding; identical protein binding
Cellular component	cytoplasm; cytosol; nucleus
Biological process	positive regulation of type I interferon production; immune system process; innate immune response; regulation of type I interferon production; biological process; positive regulation of type I interferon-mediated signaling pathway
Sources:Amigo / QuickGO
Orthologs
Databases	NCBI: entry; OMA: entry
Species	Human	Mouse
Entrez	81030	58203
Ensembl	ENSG00000124256	ENSMUSG00000027514
UniProt	Q9H171	Q9QY24
RefSeq (mRNA)	NM_001160417; NM_001160418; NM_001160419; NM_030776; NM_001323966	NM_001139519; NM_021394
RefSeq (protein)	NP_001153889; NP_001153890; NP_001153891; NP_001310895; NP_110403	NP_001132991; NP_067369
Location (UCSC)	Chr 20: 57.6 – 57.62 Mb	Chr 2: 173.05 – 173.06 Mb
PubMed search
- Wikidata
View/Edit Human	View/Edit Mouse

Z-DNA-binding protein 1 (also known as DNA-dependent activator of IFN-regulatory factors (DAI) and DLM-1) is a mammalian intracellular protein that acts as an innate immune sensor. ZBP1 senses left-handed (Z-form) double-helical Z-DNA and Z-RNA from pathogens (acting as pathogen-associated molecular patterns, PAMPs) or from endogenous sources (acting as damage-associated molecular patterns, DAMPs). ZBP1 associates with receptor-interacting protein kinase 3 (RIPK3) to engage caspases and the NLRP3 inflammasome to form a PANoptosome and initiate PANoptosis, a form of inflammatory programmed cell death.

Z-DNA binding protein 1 should not be confused with β-actin zipcode-binding protein 1 (also known as ZBP1), an alias for the mRNA-binding protein IGF2BP1.

== History ==
ZBP1 was first identified as an interferon-inducible Z-NA binding protein, but its specific functions remained unclear for many years. While it was initially thought to be a cytosolic DNA sensor, ZBP1-deficient mice responded normally to DNA and DNA virus infections, producing normal levels of interferon.

Further insights came with the discovery of ZBP1's receptor-interacting protein homotypic interaction motif (RHIM) domains, which mediate interactions with the RHIM domains of other proteins, especially RIPKs. Given the role of RIPK proteins in cell death pathways, these interactions hinted at ZBP1's involvement in cell death.

The role of ZBP1 as an innate immune sensor finally became apparent with the discovery that it regulates NLRP3 inflammasome activation, interleukin-1 cytokine maturation and release, and inflammatory cell death through PANoptosis during influenza A (IAV) virus infection. ZBP1-deficient mice showed impaired activation of inflammasome components such as caspase-1, and reduced levels of IL-1β and IL-18. Since this initial discovery, ZBP1 has been implicated in driving PANoptosis in response to a variety of triggers.

== Structure ==
ZBP1 has several key domains that contribute to its function. At the N-terminus, it has Z-nucleic acid (Z-NA) binding domains, known as Zα1 and Zα2. Both Zα domains have a winged helix-turn-helix structure which allows them to bind to Z-RNA/DNA. The intermediate region of ZBP1 contains two receptor-interacting protein homotypic interaction motif (RHIM) domains, RHIM1 and RHIM2, which facilitate interactions with other RHIM domain-containing proteins. The C-terminal region of ZBP1 contains a signal domain (SD), which is crucial for triggering an interferon response.

== Function and role in disease ==
ZBP1 was discovered as an innate immune sensor of IAV that forms the ZBP1-PANoptosome to activate the NLRP3 inflammasome, driving cell death in the form of PANoptosis. PANoptosis is a distinct innate immune, inflammatory, and lytic cell death pathway initiated by innate immune sensors and driven by caspases and receptor-interacting protein kinases (RIPKs) through PANoptosomes. PANoptosomes are multi-protein complexes assembled by germline-encoded pattern-recognition receptor(s) (PRRs) (innate immune sensor(s)) in response to pathogens, including bacterial, viral, and fungal infections, as well as PAMPs, DAMPs, cytokines, and homeostatic changes during infections, inflammatory conditions, and cancer.

Following the initial discovery of its role as an innate immune sensor of IAV in macrophages and lung cells, ZBP1 was also implicated in driving necroptosis in response to IAV in certain cell types, such as in fibroblasts. Furthermore, the ZBP1-PANoptosome was found to play key roles beyond IAV across multiple cell types. For example, the ZBP1-PANoptosome drives pathogenic inflammation in response to interferon therapy during coronavirus infection. Indeed, the transcription factor interferon response factor 1 (IRF1) is a key upstream regulator of ZBP1 expression. Modulating ZBP1 activity is therefore a potential therapeutic strategy in some viral and inflammatory contexts.

Furthermore, promoting the activity of the ZBP1-PANoptosome can have therapeutic benefit in murine tumor models, where combined interferon and nuclear export inhibitor treatment modulates the ZBP1-ADAR1 pathway and drives ZBP1-PANoptosome formation to regress tumors. Additional research found that curaxin (CBL0137), a small molecule inhibitor, induces ZBP1-mediated cell death in cancer-associated fibroblasts and reverses immune checkpoint blockade (ICB) resistance in mouse models of melanoma.

ZBP1 is also a key component of the absent in melanoma 2 (AIM2)-PANoptosome, which includes the AIM2 inflammasome, and assembles in response to Francisella novicida and herpes simplex virus 1 (HSV1) infections. ZBP1 has also been extensively implicated in other viral infections, including coronaviruses, cytomegalovirus, vaccinia, varicella-zoster virus, zika virus, and others. ZBP1 also induces PANoptosis during Candida albicans and Aspergillus fumigatus infections. It also drives PANoptosis in response to non-microbial triggers, such as ethanol.

== Z-DNA and Z-RNA binding ==
ZBP1 is named after its ability to bind Z-DNA. Z-DNA formation is a dynamic process, largely controlled by the amount of supercoiling. ZBP1 has been proposed to sense viruses by recognizing the presence of DNA in the cytoplasm, which occurs in some viral life cycles. Once ZBP1 is activated, it increases the production of antiviral cytokines such as interferon beta. ZBP1 then binds to cytosolic viral DNA using two Z-DNA-binding domains (Zα and Zβ) at its N-terminus along with a DNA binding domain (D3).

The functional importance of DNA in the activation of ZBP1 has been questioned, however. As a negative-strand RNA virus, IAV does not synthesize DNA at any stage of its life cycle. ZBP1 is capable of sensing viral Z-form RNAs such as those produced during IAV infection. Yet, a recent study found that during IAV or HSV-1 infection, ZBP1 predominantly detected host Z-RNAs arising from viral disruption of host transcription termination, not viral Z-NAs.
