= NLRP7 =

Protein-coding gene in the species Homo sapiens

Identifiers
- Aliases: NLRP7, CLR19.4, HYDM, NALP7, NOD12, PAN7, PYPAF3, NLR family, pyrin domain containing 7, NLR family pyrin domain containing 7
- External IDs: OMIM: 609661; GeneCards: NLRP7
Available structures
PDB	Human UniProt search: PDBe RCSB
PDB	List of PDB id codes 2KM6

Gene location (Human)
Chr.	Chromosome 19 (human)
Band	19q13.42	Start	54,923,509 bp
Band	19q13.42	End	54,966,312 bp
RNA expression pattern
Bgee	Human / Mouse (ortholog); Top expressed in: gonad; testicle; granulocyte; blood; left testis; right testis; duodenum; appendix; lymph node; spleen / n/a; More reference expression data
BioGPS	n/a
Gene ontology
Molecular function	ATP binding; nucleotide binding; aspartic-type endopeptidase inhibitor activity; interleukin-1 binding; caspase binding
Cellular component	cellular component
Biological process	negative regulation of endopeptidase activity; negative regulation of protein processing; cellular response to lipopolysaccharide; cellular response to interleukin-1; negative regulation of cytokine production involved in inflammatory response; negative regulation of aspartic-type peptidase activity
Sources:Amigo / QuickGO
Orthologs
Databases	NCBI: entry; OMA: entry
Species	Human	Mouse
Entrez	199713	n/a
Ensembl	ENSG00000276804; ENSG00000167634; ENSG00000278173; ENSG00000277179; ENSG00000274174 ENSG00000277776; ENSG00000277786; ENSG00000275483; ENSG00000277071; ENSG00000274571	n/a
UniProt	Q8WX94	n/a
RefSeq (mRNA)	NM_001127255; NM_139176; NM_206828; NM_001405531	n/a
RefSeq (protein)	NP_001120727; NP_631915; NP_996611	n/a
Location (UCSC)	Chr 19: 54.92 – 54.97 Mb	n/a
PubMed search		n/a
- Wikidata
View/Edit Human

NACHT, LRR and PYD domains-containing protein 7 is a protein that in humans is encoded by the NLRP7 gene.

== Function ==
NALPs are cytoplasmic proteins that form a subfamily within the larger CATERPILLER protein family. Most short NALPs, such as NALP7, have an N-terminal pyrin (MEFV) domain (PYD), followed by a NACHT domain, a NACHT-associated domain (NAD), and a C-terminal leucine-rich repeat (LRR) region. NALPs are implicated in the activation of proinflammatory caspases (e.g., CASP1) via their involvement in multiprotein complexes called inflammasomes.
