= Selnoflast =

Experimental NLRP3 inflammasome inhibitor for neurological conditions

Clinical data
- Other names: RO7486967, RG-6418, IZD334
- Routes of administration: Oral
- Drug class: NLRP3 inhibitor

Legal status
- Legal status: Investigational

Identifiers
- IUPAC name: N-[(1-ethylpiperidin-4-yl)sulfonyl]-N'-(1,2,3,5,6,7-hexahydro-s-indacen-4-yl)urea
- CAS Number: 2260969-36-4
- PubChem CID: 137402358
- UNII: T23RPA8WA2
- KEGG: D12422
- ChEMBL: ChEMBL5095423

Chemical and physical data
- Formula: C_{20}H_{29}N_{3}O_{3}S
- Molar mass: 391.53 g·mol^{−1}
- 3D model (JSmol): Interactive image
- SMILES: CCN1CCC(S(=O)(=O)NC(=O)Nc2c3c(cc4c2CCC4)CCC3)CC1
- InChI: InChI=1S/C20H29N3O3S/c1-2-23-11-9-16(10-12-23)27(25,26)22-20(24)21-19-17-7-3-5-14(17)13-15-6-4-8-18(15)19/h13,16H,2-12H2,1H3,(H2,21,22,24); Key:OHIFQOUPTWBQLE-UHFFFAOYSA-N

Selnoflast (development codes RO7486967, RG-6418, IZD334) is an experimental small-molecule drug developed by Hoffmann-La Roche for the treatment of neuroinflammatory conditions. It is an orally active, selective, and reversible inhibitor of the NLRP3 inflammasome, a key component of the innate immune system involved in inflammatory responses.

As of August 2025, selnoflast is being evaluated in clinical trials for Parkinson's disease and has previously been tested in ulcerative colitis, where it demonstrated safety and tolerability. The drug represents part of a new class of anti-inflammatory agents targeting the NLRP3 inflammasome pathway, which has been implicated in various neurodegenerative and inflammatory conditions.

== Mechanism of action ==
Selnoflast acts as a potent and selective inhibitor of the NLRP3 inflammasome, a multiprotein complex that functions as a central sensor in the innate immune system. The inflammasome is composed of three primary components: the NLRP3 sensor protein (Nucleotide-binding domain, Leucine-Rich-containing family, Pyrin domain-containing-3), the adaptor protein ASC (apoptosis-associated speck-like protein containing a CARD domain), and the zymogen procaspase-1. Upon stimulation by pathogen-associated molecular patterns (PAMPs), damaged cellular components, or protein aggregates, these components assemble to form the active inflammasome complex. Activated caspase-1 then processes and releases the proinflammatory cytokines interleukin-1β (IL-1β) and interleukin-18 (IL-18).

At the molecular level, selnoflast specifically engages the NACHT domain of the NLRP3 protein. NLRP3 itself consists of three domains: a variable N-terminal effector domain (pyrin domain, PYD), a central nucleotide-binding oligomerization domain (NACHT), and a C-terminal leucine-rich repeat (LRR) domain. By targeting this domain, selnoflast prevents the assembly of the inflammasome complex, thereby blocking downstream caspase-1 activation and subsequent cytokine release.

Through this selective inhibition, selnoflast reduces the production of proinflammatory cytokines, limiting chronic inflammation and associated tissue damage.

== Clinical studies ==
=== Ulcerative colitis ===
Selnoflast was initially evaluated in clinical studies for ulcerative colitis, where it demonstrated safety and tolerability in human subjects. These early phase studies established the basic safety profile of the compound and provided confidence for its evaluation in neurological conditions.

=== Parkinson's disease ===
In April 2022, Roche initiated the first clinical trial of an NLRP3 inhibitor in Parkinson's disease with selnoflast. The Phase 1b study (ISRCTN85338453) is a multicenter, randomized, double-blind, placebo-controlled, parallel design clinical study investigating the safety, tolerability, pharmacokinetics, and pharmacodynamics of selnoflast in participants with recently diagnosed idiopathic Parkinson's disease.

The study involves 48 participants recruited across the United States, United Kingdom, and the Netherlands. Participants receive either 200 mg of selnoflast twice daily or placebo (in a 2:1 ratio of active drug to placebo) for 28 days, followed by 24 days of follow-up assessments.

The comprehensive assessment protocol includes multiple types of brain imaging: DaTscan (to measure dopamine activity), MRI (for structural assessment), and TSPO-PET scanning (to assess neuroinflammation levels). Clinical measures and biological samples, including blood and cerebrospinal fluid, are also collected throughout the study period.

== Rationale for neurological applications ==
The development of selnoflast for neurological conditions is based on substantial preclinical evidence demonstrating the role of NLRP3 inflammasome activation in neurodegenerative diseases, particularly Parkinson's disease.

Research has shown that postmortem brain tissue from patients with Parkinson's disease exhibits increased levels of cleaved caspase-1 and ASC, hallmarks of inflammasome activation. Additionally, studies have found elevated NLRP3 inflammasome markers in blood samples from Parkinson's patients, suggesting systemic inflammasome activation.

Preclinical studies using the NLRP3 inhibitor MCC950 (a chemically related compound) demonstrated that NLRP3 inhibition could cross the blood-brain barrier and provide neuroprotective effects in multiple mouse models of Parkinson's disease, including neurotoxin-based, genetic, and alpha-synuclein aggregate models. Treatment with MCC950 improved motor function, reduced dopaminergic cell loss, and significantly decreased brain inflammation markers.

== Development history ==
Selnoflast was developed by Roche following their acquisition of the Irish biotech company Inflazome in September 2020 for $449 million. The acquisition gave Roche access to Inflazome's inflammasome-targeting intellectual property portfolio, including selnoflast.

Prior to the Inflazome acquisition, Roche had already begun building expertise in the inflammasome space through the purchase of Jecure Therapeutics in late 2018, which provided access to additional preclinical NLRP3 inhibitors aimed at various inflammatory conditions.

== Regulatory status ==
Selnoflast currently has investigational status and has not been approved by any regulatory agency for clinical use. The drug is being evaluated in ongoing clinical trials for Parkinson's disease and has been designated for potential evaluation in other neuroinflammatory conditions.
