= Identification of cell death =

Standards for the identification of cell death have changed. Cell death used to be defined and described based on morphology. Now there is a switch in classifying it basing on molecular and genetic definitions. This description is more functional and applies to both in vitro and in vivo, so cell death subroutines are now described by a series of precise, measurable, biochemical features. A set of recommendations for describing the terminology of cell death was proposed by the Nomenclature Committee on Cell Death (NCCD) in 2009, because misusing words and concepts may slow down progress in the area of cell death research.

The classic definition of death defines it as a state characterized by the cessation of signs of life. It is when a cell has lost the integrity of its plasma membrane and/or has undergone complete disintegration, including its nucleus, and/or its fragments have been engulfed by a neighboring cell in vivo. It is caused by an irreversible functional imbalance and collapse of the internal organization of a system. The role of cell death is the maintenance of tissue and organ homeostasis, for example, the regular loss of skin cells or a more active role seen in involuting tissues like the thymus.

Cells die either by accident or design. In fact there are two mechanisms of cell death; necrosis and apoptosis (apoptosis in invertebrates is called cell deletion). Dying cells are engaged in a process that is reversible until a first irreversible phase or "point-of-no-return" is trespassed.

Necrosis is an unprogrammed death of cells, which involves early plasma membrane changes leading to loss of calcium and sodium imbalance. This causes acidosis, osmotic shock, clumping of chromatin and nuclear pyknosis. These changes are accompanied by a loss of oxidative phosphorylation, a drop in ATP production, and a loss of homeostatic capability. There are also mitochondrial changes which include calcium overload and activation of phospholipases leading to membrane diffusion signals, a stage of irreversible damage. The secondary stage involves swelling of the lysosome, dilation of the endoplasmic reticulum, a leakage of enzymes and proteins and a loss of compartmentalization.

Apoptosis, or programmed cell death, is generally characterized by distinct morphological characteristics and energy-dependent biochemical mechanisms. It is considered a vital component of various processes of life including normal cell turnover, proper development and functioning of the immune system, hormone dependent atrophy, embryonic development and chemical-induced cell death. For example, the differentiation of fingers and toes in a developing human embryo occurs because cells between the fingers apoptose, resulting in separate digits.

== Cell death methodology ==
Definition	Notes	Methods of detection^{3-5}
Molecular or morphological criteria to define dead cells
Loss of plasma membrane integrity	Plasma membrane was broken down, leading to the loss of cell's identity	(IF) Microscopy and/or FACS to assess the elimination of the vital dyes, in vitro
Cell fragmentation	The whole cell has undergone complete fragmentation into discrete bodies (apoptotic bodies)	(IF) Microscopy FACS quantification of hypodiploid events (sub-G_{1} peak)
Engulfment by adjacent cells	Neighboring cells phagocytosed the corpse or its fragments	(IF) Microscopy FACS colocalization studies
Proposed points-of-no return to define dying cells
Massive activation of caspases	The classic apoptotic program is initiated by Caspases, yet in several cases, caspase-independent death occurs. Moreover, caspases are involved in non-lethal other processes including differentiation and activation of cells	Immunoblotting FACS quantification by means of fluorogenic substrates or specific antibodies
dissipation	transient dissipation is not always a lethal event, but protracted loss usually precedes MMP and cell death;	FACS quantification with ΔΨ_{m}-sensitive probes Calcein-cobalt technique
MMP	Complete MMP results in the release of lethal catabolic enzymes or activators of such enzymes. Nonetheless, partial permeabilization may not always lead to cell death	IF colocalization studies Immunoblotting after subcellular fractionation
PS exposure	An early event of apoptosis is the PS exposure on the outer leaflet of the plasma membrane, but it may be reversible. PS exposure occurs also in T-cell activation, without cell death.	FACS quantification of Annexin V binding
Operative definition of cell death, in particular in cancer research
Loss of clonogenic survival	Long-lasting or irreversible cell cycle arrest that leads to cell death can't be distinguished by this method.	Clonogenic assays

== The morphometric method ==
The morphometric method is a way to demonstrate cell death in the laboratory. Morphometric measurement provides the result of cell death as a volume, size, weight and length of tissue, organ and the whole organism that compares with before and after the occurrence of cell death. This method was observed by Attalah and Johnson who used electronic particle analyses to determine cell viability.

=== Histochemical and autoradiographical techniques ===
Another indicator of cell death is acid hydrolysis, which is released from digestion during phagocytosis of dead cells by macrophages or neighboring cells, and the intravital dye is a marker of secondary phagocytosis.

=== Histological and cytochemical techniques ===
To demonstrate cell death in some cases a vital dye is used to detect when cellular function is disrupted. This procedure uses living tissue that is immersed in diluted 1:0000 solution of Nile blue sulphate in saline. The measurement of cell death by using this dye is observing a change of color or the formation of fluorescence. When the cell died the nucleus went through destruction stages, one of them pyknosis, which lead to the release of a basic histone group and this happened when the irreversible condensation of chromatins occurred. The phagocytosis process took place in secondary lysosomes and the autophagy and heterophagy controlled the dead cell by acid hydrolysis activity. The techniques used to explained this is by the detection of (6-3H)-thymidine and acid phosphates' activity in cryostat.

==== Procedure ====
Specimen was injected with (6-3H)-thymidine, and then the tissue was sacrificed, removed after 1 hour and quenched in liquid nitrogen. Then 4 μm cryostat sections were cut and mounted on clean cover slips, the cover slips were held with sections in cryostat, fixed in cold analar acetone for 10 minutes and the cover slips were rinsed in buffer-incubated in acid phosphate medium (15 minutes). Naphthol AS TR phosphate was used as the substrate and hexazonium paraosaniline as coupler. Again the sections were rinsed thoroughly in distilled water and the sections were dipped in autoradiography emulsion (I1ford L4 diluted 1:5). Preparations were exposed to be (0-4 °C) 2 to 3 weeks in dark room. The photographical slide was processed, counterstained in haematoxylin and mounted for microscopy.

==== Results ====
The result of this experiment is the red color which is caused by azo-dye technique done above and this is an indicator that cell autolysis occurred. This was the major aim in the morphometric method. Another thing is the production of silver grains in the photographic emulsion.

==== Discussion ====
This change in color is due to fine homogeneous red reaction of acid phosphatase activity. In the lysosome there's a lot of indication of cell death like the free hydrolase. Incorporate tritiated thymidine gives silver grains in the photographic emulsion which happened in the cell nuclei. The ideal tissue for this procedure is thymus tissue. This discussion focuses on two changes that occur in the thymus of mouse as an example study. The first change is the ratio of cells that are dying (diffusing acid phosphatase) and the second is the thymidine incorporating cells (cells synthesizing DNA). The results are compared according to the age of the mouse. After measuring the ratios and numbers, the conclusion is that the level of cell death in involuting thymus doubled in comparison to the young thymus and the thymidine decreased in the older thymus compared to the young thymus. To further show these results it was observed that some thymocytes contained lysosomal sites of acid phosphatase activity. When the macrophages engulfed the dying cells the levels of acid phosphatase increased.

=== Autoradiography technique with histological staining ===
Lewis employed autoradiographic incorporation of 3H-thymidine to calculate mitotic indices and estimate pyknotic indices. This technique can be used to study the tissue kinetics of tumors and has applications in the scanning electron microscope.

=== Scanning electron microscopy ===
The scanning electron microscope was employed by Hodges and Muir (1975) to study autoradiograph. This approach was combined with the cytochemical method for demonstrating free acid phosphate and cell lysis. Dying cells which are rich in free acid phosphate will contain a brominated reaction product and will give a characteristic signal for bromine when subjected to x-ray microanalysis. Fine structural studies There are common fine-structural changes occurring in dying cells. This was concluded after some attempts from the scientists like Kerr (1972) who proposed the general concept of apoptosis in vertebrates, While Scheweichel and Merker (1973) described induced and physiological cell death in prenatal mouse tissues. Using fine structural distinctions, it is possible to recognize and differentiate between the types of cell death, Acid phosphate and cell deletion:

Acid phosphate is an enzyme or group of iso-enzymes which can be used in demonstrating cell death and this can be easily observed by the electron microscope. P-nitrophoenyl phosphate activity can be used as a good marker for cell death. This marker has been used to localize the cell death in cells during embryological development, and the result noticed was the release of exoplasmic nonlysosomal acid phosphate. This appears as a sign of cell death. There are many experiments showing that the ectoplasmic p-nitrophoenyl phosphate which was released is related to ribosomes not to lysosomes.

== DNA, RNA and protein synthesis in cell death ==
Programmed cell death means genetic control of the process, thus genes specifying cell death in a developmental sequence must be present. Many authors show that there may be a premonitory increase in protein synthesis as a primer for programmed cell death.

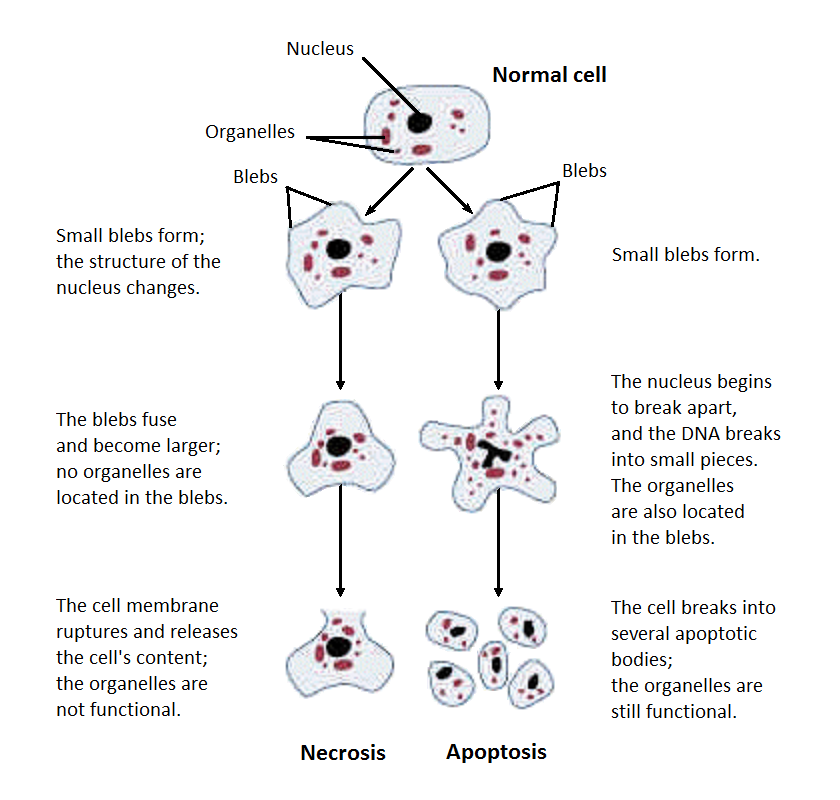
necrosis
