= NINJ1 =

Protein-coding gene in the species Homo sapiens

Identifiers
- Aliases: NINJ1, NIN1, NINJURIN, ninjurin 1
- External IDs: OMIM: 602062; MGI: 1196617; GeneCards: NINJ1

Gene location (Human)
Chr.	Chromosome 9 (human)
Band	9q22.31	Start	93,121,496 bp
Band	9q22.31	End	93,134,251 bp

Gene location (Mouse)
Chr.	Chromosome 13 (mouse)
Band	13|13 A5	Start	49,340,961 bp
Band	13|13 A5	End	49,349,720 bp
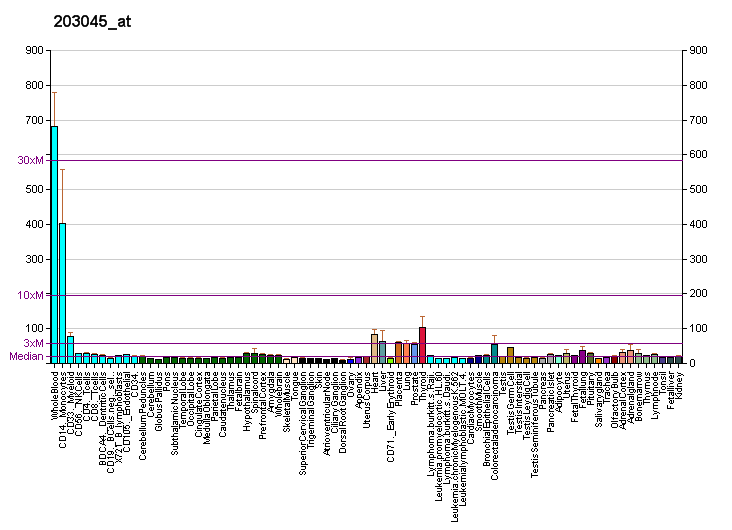
RNA expression pattern
Bgee	Human / Mouse (ortholog); Top expressed in: right adrenal cortex; left adrenal gland; left adrenal cortex; monocyte; thoracic aorta; ascending aorta; Descending thoracic aorta; right lobe of liver; blood; gastric mucosa / Top expressed in: stroma of bone marrow; pyloric antrum; right kidney; left lobe of liver; facial motor nucleus; calvaria; utricle; tibiofemoral joint; vestibular sensory epithelium; primary oocyte; More reference expression data
BioGPS	More reference expression data
Gene ontology
Molecular function	protein binding
Cellular component	integral component of membrane; membrane
Biological process	hyaloid vascular plexus regression; cell adhesion; nervous system development; tissue regeneration; positive regulation of cell-matrix adhesion; pyroptosis; cell death
Sources:Amigo / QuickGO
Orthologs
Databases	NCBI: entry; OMA: entry
Species	Human	Mouse
Entrez	4814	18081
Ensembl	ENSG00000131669	ENSMUSG00000037966
UniProt	Q92982	O70131
RefSeq (mRNA)	NM_004148	NM_013610
RefSeq (protein)	NP_004139	NP_038638
Location (UCSC)	Chr 9: 93.12 – 93.13 Mb	Chr 13: 49.34 – 49.35 Mb
PubMed search
- Wikidata
View/Edit Human	View/Edit Mouse

Ninjurin-1 is a protein encoded by the NINJ1 gene in humans.

== Gene ==
NINJ1 is located on the long arm of chromosome 9 (9q22.31).

== Function ==
This transmembrane protein plays a critical role in plasma membrane rupture during lytic cell death. NINJ1 is involved in the terminal stages of cell rupture across various cell death pathways, including pyroptosis, necroptosis, and ferroptosis. By disrupting cell membranes, NINJ1 facilitates the release of intracellular proteins, such as lactate dehydrogenase and various Damage Associated Molecular Patterns (DAMPs) into the extracellular environment, triggering inflammation. Upon activation, NINJ1 assembles into a chain-like oligomer that forms a ring structure—dubbed the "Ninja Cutter"—which, like a cookie cutter, cuts and releases membrane disks, enabling cell rupture.

== Clinical significance ==
Since NINJ1 is involved in inflammatory cell death and release of DAMPs that are important for immune response to infection, loss or inhibition of NINJ1 may promote susceptibility to bacterial infections. This is supported by studies using Ninj1^{-/-} knockout mice, which are more susceptible to infection with C. rodentium compared to wild type mice.

NINJ1 circulating plasma levels are elevated in patients with sepsis and correlate with disease severity and mortality, making NINJ1 a potential prognostic biomarker for sepsis monitoring.
