= Cell death =

Biological cell ceasing to carry out its functions

Overview of signal transduction pathways involved in apoptosis

Cell death is the event of a biological cell ceasing to carry out its functions. This may be the result of the natural process of old cells dying and being replaced by new ones, as in programmed cell death, or may result from factors such as diseases, localized injury, or the death of the organism of which the cells are part. Apoptosis or type I cell-death, and autophagy or type II cell-death are both forms of programmed cell death, while necrosis is a non-physiological process that occurs as a result of infection or injury.

The term "cell necrobiology" has been used to describe the life processes associated with morphological, biochemical, and molecular changes which predispose, precede, and accompany cell death, as well as the consequences and tissue response to cell death. The word is derived from the Greek νεκρό meaning "death", βìο meaning "life", and λόγος meaning "the study of". The term was initially coined to broadly define investigations of the changes that accompany cell death, detected and measured by multiparameter flow- and laser scanning- cytometry. It has been used to describe the real-time changes during cell death, detected by flow cytometry.

== Types ==
=== Programmed cell death ===
Programmed cell death (PCD), sometimes referred to as cell suicide or cellular suicide, is the death of a cell as a result of events inside of a cell, such as apoptosis or autophagy. PCD is carried out in a biological process, which usually confers advantage during an organism's lifecycle. For example, the differentiation of fingers and toes in a developing human embryo occurs because cells between the fingers apoptose; the result is that the digits are separate. PCD serves fundamental functions during both plant and animal tissue development.

Apoptosis and autophagy are both forms of programmed cell death. Necrosis is the death of a cell caused by external factors such as trauma or infection and occurs in several different forms. Necrosis was long seen as a non-physiological process that occurs as a result of infection or injury, but in the 2000s, a form of programmed necrosis, called necroptosis, was recognized as an alternative form of programmed cell death. It is hypothesized that necroptosis can serve as a cell-death backup to apoptosis when the apoptosis signaling is blocked by endogenous or exogenous factors such as viruses or mutations. Most recently, other types of regulated necrosis have been discovered as well, which share several signaling events with necroptosis and apoptosis.

Programmed cell death (PCD) is cell death mediated by an intracellular program. PCD is carried out in a regulated process, which usually confers advantage during an organism's life-cycle. For example, the differentiation of fingers and toes in a developing human embryo occurs because cells between the fingers apoptose; the result is that the digits separate. PCD serves fundamental functions during both plant and metazoa (multicellular animals) tissue development.

==== Apoptosis ====
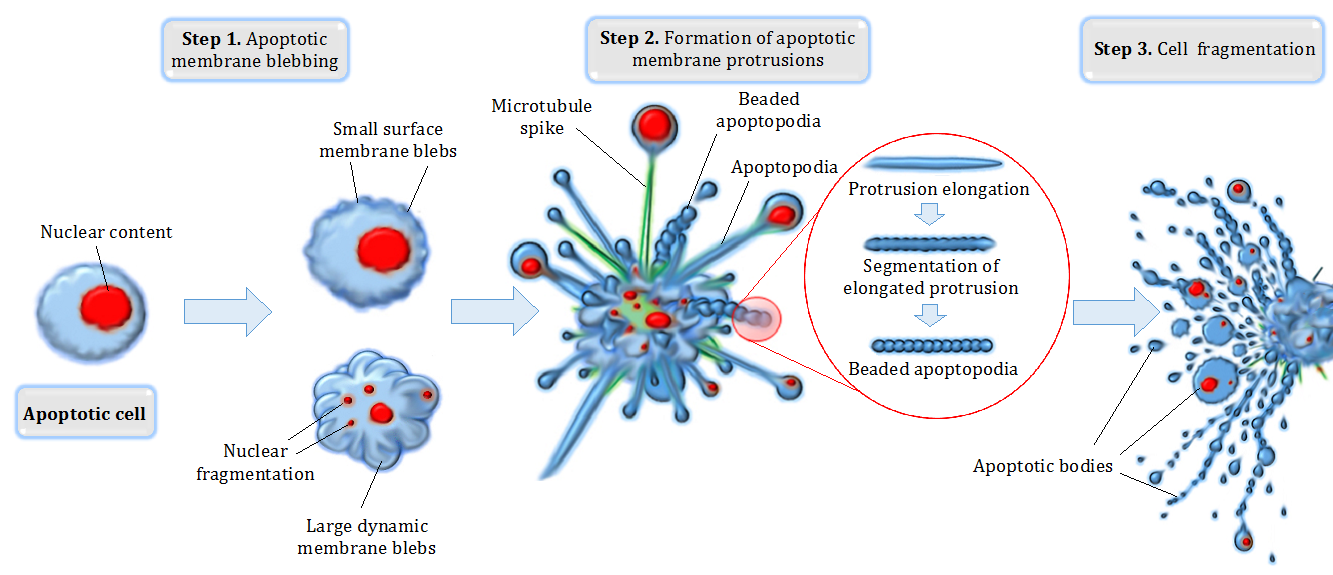
Morphological changes associated with apoptosis

Apoptosis is the processor of programmed cell death (PCD) that may occur in multicellular organisms. Biochemical events lead to characteristic cell changes (morphology) and death. These changes include blebbing, cell shrinkage, nuclear fragmentation, chromatin condensation, and chromosomal DNA fragmentation. It is now thought that – in a developmental context – cells are induced to positively commit suicide whilst in a homeostatic context; the absence of certain survival factors may provide the impetus for suicide. There appears to be some variation in the morphology and indeed the biochemistry of these suicide pathways; some treading the path of "apoptosis", others following a more generalized pathway to deletion, but both usually being genetically and synthetically motivated. There is some evidence that certain symptoms of "apoptosis" such as endonuclease activation can be spuriously induced without engaging a genetic cascade, however, presumably true apoptosis and programmed cell death must be genetically mediated. It is also becoming clear that mitosis and apoptosis are toggled or linked in some way and that the balance achieved depends on signals received from appropriate growth or survival factors.

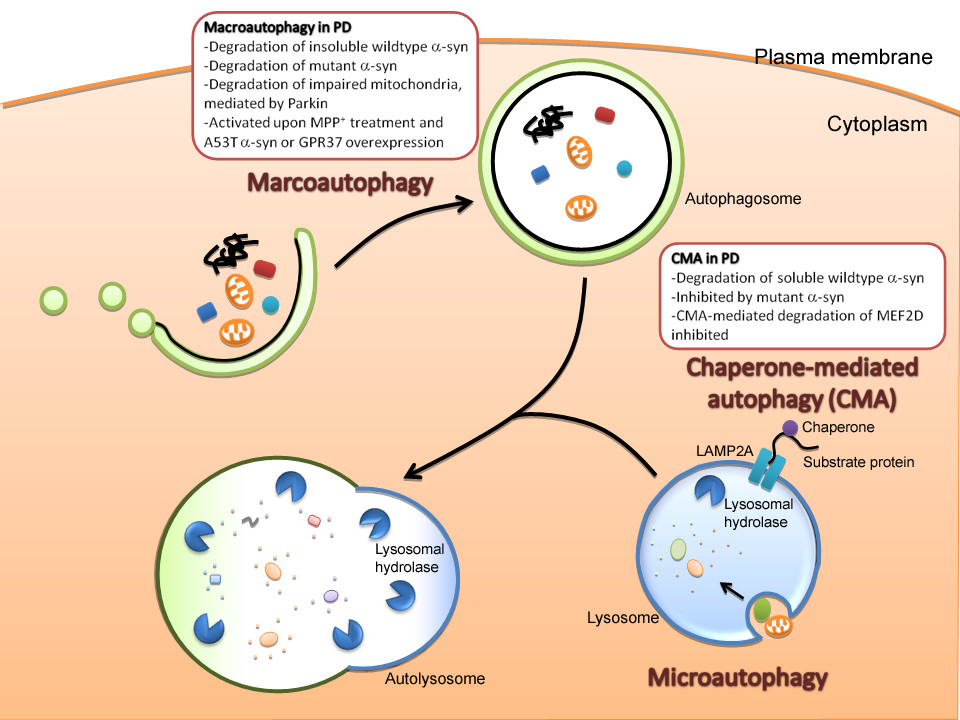
Example events in autophagy

Certain key proteins primarily employed in the repair of DNA damage can also induce apoptosis when DNA damage exceeds the cell’s repair capability. These dual role proteins protect against proliferation of unstable damaged cells that might lead to cancer.

==== Autophagy ====
Autophagy is cytoplasmic, characterized by the formation of large vacuoles that eat away organelles in a specific sequence prior to the destruction of the nucleus. Macroautophagy, often referred to as autophagy, is a catabolic process that results in the autophagosomic-lysosomal degradation of bulk cytoplasmic contents, abnormal protein aggregates, and excess or damaged organelles. Autophagy is generally activated by conditions of nutrient deprivation but has also been associated with physiological as well as pathological processes such as development, differentiation, neurodegenerative diseases, stress, infection and cancer.

==== Other variations of PCD ====
Other pathways of programmed cell death have been discovered. Called "non-apoptotic programmed cell-death" (or "caspase-independent programmed cell-death"), these alternative routes to death are as efficient as apoptosis and can function as either backup mechanisms or the main type of PCD.

Some such forms of programmed cell death are anoikis, almost identical to apoptosis except in its induction; cornification, a form of cell death exclusive to the skin; excitotoxicity; ferroptosis, an iron-dependent form of cell death and Wallerian degeneration.

Plant cells undergo particular processes of PCD similar to autophagic cell death. However, some common features of PCD are highly conserved in both plants and metazoa.

Activation-induced cell death (AICD) is a programmed cell death caused by the interaction of Fas receptor (Fas, CD95)and Fas ligand (FasL, CD95 ligand). It occurs as a result of repeated stimulation of specific T-cell receptors (TCR) and it helps to maintain the peripheral immune tolerance. Therefore, an alteration of the process may lead to autoimmune diseases. In other words AICD is the negative regulator of activated T-lymphocytes.

Ischemic cell death, or oncosis, is a form of accidental, or passive cell death that is often considered a lethal injury. The process is characterized by mitochondrial swelling, cytoplasm vacuolization, and swelling of the nucleus and cytoplasm.

Mitotic catastrophe is an oncosuppressive mechanism that can lead to cell death that is due to premature or inappropriate entry of cells into mitosis. It is the most common mode of cell death in cancer cells exposed to ionizing radiation and many other anti-cancer treatments.

Immunogenic cell death or immunogenic apoptosis is a form of cell death caused by some cytostatic agents such as anthracyclines, oxaliplatin and bortezomib, or radiotherapy and photodynamic therapy (PDT).

Pyroptosis is a highly inflammatory form of programmed cell death that occurs most frequently upon infection with intracellular pathogens and is likely to form part of the antimicrobial response in myeloid cells.

PANoptosis is an innate immune, lytic cell death pathway initiated by innate immune sensors and driven by caspases and RIP kinases through PANoptosome complexes. To date, several PANoptosome complexes have been characterized, including ZBP1-, AIM2-, RIPK1-, NLRC5-/NLRP12-, and NLRP3-PANoptosomes. PANoptosis is critical in innate immune responses for host defense, but it has also been implicated in inflammation and pathology in inflammatory diseases, infections, and cancers.

Phagoptosis is cell death resulting from a live cell being phagocytosed (i.e. eaten) by another cell (usually a phagocyte), resulting in death and digestion of the engulfed cell. Phagoptosis can occur to cells that are pathogenic, cancerous, aged, damaged or excess to requirements.

=== Necrotic cell death ===
Necrosis is cell death where a cell has been badly damaged through external forces such as trauma or infection and occurs in several different forms. It is the sum of what happens to cells after their deaths. In necrosis, a cell undergoes swelling, followed by uncontrolled rupture of the cell membrane with cell contents being expelled. These cell contents often then go on to cause inflammation in nearby cells. A form of programmed necrosis, called necroptosis, has been recognized as an alternative form of programmed cell death. It is hypothesized that necroptosis can serve as a cell-death backup to apoptosis when the apoptosis signaling is blocked by endogenous or exogenous factors such as viruses or mutations. Necroptotic pathways are associated with death receptors such as the tumor necrosis factor receptor 1. Identification of cell death was previously classified based on morphology, but in recent years switched to molecular and genetic conditions.

Widespread cell death leads to changes in whole-body ionic composition described as sick cell syndrome.

== See also ==
- Programmed cell death 1, a protein
- Tumor Necrosis Factor 1
- Cell Death eBook by Rockland Immunochemicals
- Cellular anastasis
