= AIM2 =

Protein found in humans

Identifiers
- Aliases: AIM2, PYHIN4, absent in melanoma 2
- External IDs: OMIM: 604578; MGI: 2686159; GeneCards: AIM2
Available structures
PDB	Ortholog search: PDBe RCSB
PDB	List of PDB id codes 3RN2, 3RN5, 3VD8, 4O7Q

Gene location (Human)
Chr.	Chromosome 1 (human)
Band	1q23.1|1q23.1-q23.2	Start	159,061,599 bp
Band	1q23.1|1q23.1-q23.2	End	159,187,843 bp

Gene location (Mouse)
Chr.	Chromosome 1 (mouse)
Band	1|1 H3	Start	173,350,879 bp
Band	1|1 H3	End	173,466,040 bp
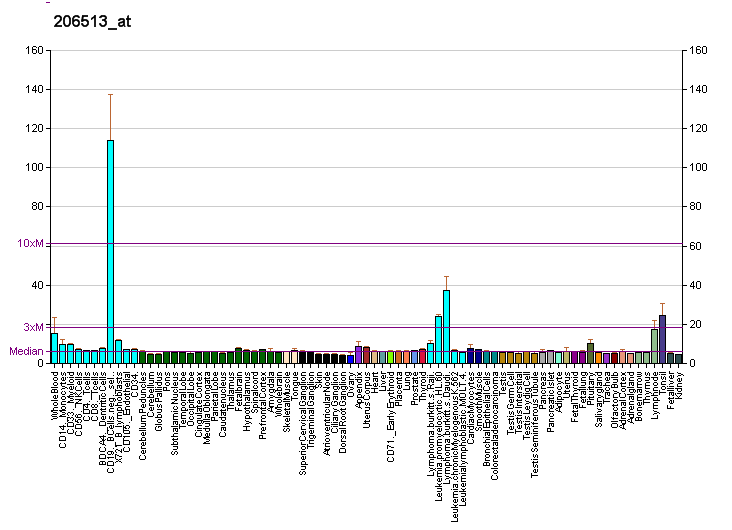
RNA expression pattern
Bgee	Human / Mouse (ortholog); Top expressed in: lymph node; spleen; sperm; monocyte; appendix; superficial temporal artery; blood; pituitary gland; epithelium of nasopharynx; gonad / Top expressed in: granulocyte; ventricular zone; thymus; left colon; embryo; subiculum; genital tubercle; embryo; lateral geniculate nucleus; medial geniculate nucleus; More reference expression data
BioGPS	More reference expression data
Gene ontology
Molecular function	DNA binding; protein binding; identical protein binding; double-stranded DNA binding
Cellular component	cytoplasm; AIM2 inflammasome complex; nucleus; nucleoplasm; mitochondrion; cytosol
Biological process	positive regulation of cysteine-type endopeptidase activity; pyroptosis; cellular response to interferon-beta; immune system process; tumor necrosis factor-mediated signaling pathway; positive regulation of NF-kappaB transcription factor activity; immune response; positive regulation of interleukin-1 beta production; positive regulation of protein oligomerization; activation of innate immune response; inflammatory response; negative regulation of NF-kappaB transcription factor activity; positive regulation of defense response to virus by host; apoptotic process; innate immune response
Sources:Amigo / QuickGO
Orthologs
Databases	NCBI: entry; OMA: entry
Species	Human	Mouse
Entrez	9447	383619
Ensembl	ENSG00000163568	ENSMUSG00000037860
UniProt	O14862	Q91VJ1
RefSeq (mRNA)	NM_004833; NM_001348247	NM_001013779
RefSeq (protein)	NP_004824; NP_001335176	NP_001013801
Location (UCSC)	Chr 1: 159.06 – 159.19 Mb	Chr 1: 173.35 – 173.47 Mb
PubMed search
- Wikidata
View/Edit Human	View/Edit Mouse

Interferon-inducible protein AIM2 also known as absent in melanoma 2 or simply AIM2 is a protein that in humans is encoded by the AIM2 gene.

AIM2 is a cytoplasmic sensor found in hematopoietic cells that recognizes the presence of double-stranded DNA (dsDNA) of microbial or host cellular origin. AIM2-like receptor (ALR) family was founded on AIM2 and now consists of four members in human genome. Activated AIM2 recruits apoptosis-associated speck-like protein containing a CARD (ASC), resulting in caspase-1 binding, and forming of AIM2 inflammasome. This signaling contributes to the defense against bacterial and viral DNA. The AIM2 inflammasome can also be an integral component of the AIM2-PANoptosome to drive PANoptosis.

== Structure ==
Proteins belonging to ALR family usually contain an N-terminal pyrin (PYD) domain, and one or two HIN domains. AIM2 consists of two domains connected through a long linker: an N-terminal PYD domain (amino acids 1-87), and a C-terminal HIN-200 domain (amino acids 138–337). The PYD domain mediates homotypic protein-protein interaction, while the HIN domain binds to DNA with its two tandem oligonucleotide/oligosaccharide binding (OB) folds.

== Function ==
AIM2 is a component of the innate immune system that functions as a cytoplasmic dsDNA sensor playing a role in antiviral and antibacterial defenses, as well as in autoimmune diseases involving self DNA. Together with the adaptor ASC protein AIM2 forms a caspase-1 activating complex known as the AIM2 inflammasome. This AIM2 inflammasome can also be an integral component of a larger cell death-inducing complex called the AIM2-PANoptosome that drives PANoptosis.

The first step in the formation of AIM2 inflammasome is DNA binding. The HIN domain of AIM2 binds to both strands of B-form dsDNA (either viral, bacterial, or even host) in a sequence-independent manner. However, the DNA sequence must be at least 80 base pairs in length. The interaction is mainly electrostatic, where positively charged amino acid residues are coordinating with phosphates and sugar moieties on DNA backbone. Binding of dsDNA displaces PYD domain, which then engages the downstream inflammasome adaptor protein ASC through homotypic PYD-PYD interactions. ASC is a bipartite PYD-CARD-containing protein. CARD domain of ASC recruits procaspase-1 (CARD-CARD interaction) to the complex creating the basic structural elements of the AIM2 inflammasome. Caspase-1 autoactivates and processes cleavage of pro-IL-1β, pro-IL-18, and gasdermin D. The N-terminal fragment of gasdermin D induces pyroptosis that allows mature cytokines IL-1β, and IL-18 to be released from the cell.

AIM2 can also induce PANoptosis, a prominent innate immune, inflammatory, and lytic cell death pathway initiated by innate immune sensors and driven by caspases and receptor-interacting protein kinases (RIPKs) through PANoptosomes. PANoptosomes are multi-protein complexes assembled by germline-encoded pattern-recognition receptor(s) (PRRs) (innate immune sensor(s)) in response to pathogens, including bacterial, viral, and fungal infections, as well as pathogen-associated molecular patterns, damage-associated molecular patterns, cytokines, and homeostatic changes during infections, inflammatory conditions, and cancer. To form the PANoptosome, the AIM2 inflammasome further interacts with caspase-8, FADD, RIPK3, and RIPK1 in response to specific pathogens, including Francisella novicida and herpes simplex virus 1 (HSV1), to drive PANoptosis.

== Regulation ==
Regulation of inflammasome assembly is essential for cellular homeostasis maintenance. AIM2 activation is inhibited by the mouse protein p202 that consists of two HIN domains and lacks the PYD. ASC protein is not recruited due to the absence of PYD domain. The HIN1 domain binds to DNA, whereas HIN2 domain interacts with AIM2. HIN2 domain does not block the DNA binding surface of AIM2, hence, DNA binding affinity of AIM2 remains unaffected. It is believed that binding of p202 to DNA and AIM2 might attain a balance between host defense and pathological DNA-induced inflammation. When both p202 and AIM2 are present in equal amounts, there is a competition for dsDNA binding.

A novel transcript isoform of human IFI16-designated IFI16-β has been also shown to inhibit the AIM2 inflammasome assembly. Its domain structure is similar to that of mouse p202 as it contains two HIN domains. Analogously it interacts with AIM2, competes in dsDNA binding, and disrupts ASC recruitment. According to studies of p202 and IFI16-β, it appears that proteins expressing two HIN domains bind to dsDNA more robustly than proteins containing a single HIN domain.

Regarding post-translational modifications, there is limited knowledge. However, it has been reported that TRIM11 binds AIM2 and leads to its degradation. Hence, it might be a negative regulator of the AIM2 inflammasome.

== Clinical relevance ==
A broad range of microbes is sensed by AIM2, leading to protective inflammasome- or PANoptosome-mediated host responses. Recent publications have shown that AIM2 inflammasome also plays roles in non-infectious diseases.

=== Infection ===
==== Bacteria ====
Bacterial DNA is released into the cytoplasm during infection of a host cell, where it is recognized by AIM2 and other cytoplasmic DNA sensors. AIM2 has been shown to recognize a number of pathogenic bacteria – Francisella tularensis, Listeria monocytogenes, Streptococcus pneumoniae, Mycobacterium species, Porphyromonas gingivalis, Staphylococcus aureus, Brucella abortus, and Chlamydia muridarum. Type I IFNs augment the activity of the AIM2 inflammasome during bacterial infection. In addition, AIM2 assembles the AIM2-PANoptosome complex in response to Francisella novicida, inducing inflammatory cell death, PANoptosis.

==== Viruses ====
During a viral infection, MER41.AIM2, human endogenous retrovirus, has been found to regulate the transcription of AIM2. AIM2 inflammasome plays a crucial role in the defense against viral infection as genetic material from DNA viruses that enter the cytoplasm can be recognized. However, AIM2 does not respond to all DNA viruses. To date, only mouse cytomegalovirus (MCMV), vaccinia virus, and human papillomaviruses have been observed to induce AIM2 inflammasome. AIM2 also responds to herpes simplex virus 1 (HSV1), forming the AIM2-PANoptosome, which leads to PANoptosis.

==== Other pathogens ====
Moreover, AIM2 has been shown to mediate host defense to the fungal pathogen Aspergillus fumigatus and the protozoan Plasmodium berghei.

=== Cancer ===
The gene encoding AIM2 was originally isolated from human melanoma cells. AIM2 has been shown to suppress the development of tumors. However, the expression of AIM2 was observed to be differential in a range of tumor tissues suggesting that it may have unique roles in different cancer types. Recent studies investigating AIM2 function in cancer highlight the potential role of therapies inhibiting the AKT pathway in the treatment of cancer associated with AIM2 mutations.

=== Inflammatory, autoimmune, and other pathological conditions ===
The accumulation of DNA in the cytosol can serve as an endogenous danger signal triggering AIM2 inflammasome. Aberrant activation of AIM2 from self-DNA is a key driver of inflammatory and autoimmune diseases. Elevated levels of AIM2 expression are found in skin cells from people with acute and chronic skin conditions, including psoriasis, atopic dermatitis, and contact dermatitis. Increased expression of AIM2 has also been reported in patients with inflammatory bowel disease and liver inflammation. Moreover, AIM2 might be involved in inflammation and cell death of the brain. In systemic lupus erythematosus, lysosome dysfunction allows DNA to gain access to the cytosol and activate AIM2 resulting in increased type 1 interferon production.
