= Citrobacter rodentium =

Scientific classification
- Domain: Bacteria
- Kingdom: Pseudomonadati
- Phylum: Pseudomonadota
- Class: Gammaproteobacteria
- Order: Enterobacterales
- Family: Enterobacteriaceae
- Genus: Citrobacter
- Species: C. rodentium

Binomial name
- Citrobacter rodentium Schauer et al. 1996

Species of bacterium

Citrobacter rodentium is a Gram-negative species of bacteria first described in 1996. It infects the intestinal tract of rodents.

== Cell morphology and features ==
C. rodentium is an extracellular pathogen of rodents. While its specific structure has not been characterized in detail, several characteristics of this species can be inferred by its classification. As a member of the Enterobacteriaceae family, it is Gram-negative, rod-shaped, and non-spore-forming.

C. rodentium contains a conserved pathogenicity island in its genome, the locus of enterocyte effacement (LEE). The LEE encodes a type III secretion system which is critical to the infection and pathogenicity of C. rodentium. Only one virulence factor has been identified that is specific to C. rodentium: cfc (Colonization factor Citrobacter). cfc encodes the CFC type IV pilus, which has an unknown role, but may be related to multiple aspects of pathogenicity.

An analysis of the C. rodentium genome has shown that prophage insertion has disrupted several of its genes, including the flagella biosynthesis pathways and galactitol metabolism.

== Phylogeny and genome evolution ==
Initially thought to be a pathogenic biotype of Citrobacter freundii, Citrobacter rodentium has been classified as its own species using biochemical and genomic evidence.

Whole-genome sequencing of Citrobacter rodentium strain ICC168 revealed a single circular chromosome and four plasmids. It also revealed that C. rodentium shares synteny with Escherichia coli and other members of Enterobacteriaceae. Additionally, the genome contains 17 genomic islands, 10 prophage regions, and 109 insertion elements^{4}. Phylogenetic analyses suggest that Citrobacter is a polyphyletic genus.

Further genome sequencing of C. rodentium strain EX-33 showed significant similarity to strain ICC168.

C. rodentium has lost the ability to synthesize flagella due to the insertion of prophages in genes encoding elements of the biosynthesis pathway.

== Metabolic details ==
C. rodentium is a non-motile, facultative aerobe that lives in the intestinal tract of mice. The indole production test is negative, and it cannot grow on citrate or KCN. It is negative for arginine dihydrolase (meaning it cannot utilize arginine as a carbon and energy source) and is negative for H_{2}S production. Additionally, it does not produce acid from sucrose, docitol, melibiose, or glycerol.

In contrast, C. rodentium was positive for the ornithine decarboxylase test, indicating that it contains the enzyme ornithine decarboxylase. It is also positive for malonate utilization.

C. rodentium varies its metabolism during different phases of infection. Oxygenation of the intestinal epithelium occurs as a result of C. rodentium infection, which allows it to switch from anaerobic respiration to aerobic respiration. This helps this pathogen to outcompete many obligate anaerobes of the host's microbiome.

== Relevance to other systems ==
C. rodentium is a mouse pathogen and causes attaching/effacing lesions in the intestinal epithelium. Because of its relatedness to E. coli, C. rodentium is used as a model pathogen to study E. coli infection in mice. C. rodentium also possesses Intimin β, which is important to its virulence in mice.

The infection cycle of C. rodentium has been studied in detail and comprises four main phases: the establishment phase (phase 1), the expansion phase (phase 2), the steady-state phase (phase 3), and the clearance phase (phase 4). The immune response has similarly been studied in detail and varies across the phases of infection. Inflammasome activation may be an important aspect of C. rodentium infection.
