= NLRP12 =

Protein-coding gene in the species Homo sapiens

Identifiers
- Aliases: NLRP12, CLR19.3, FCAS2, NALP12, PAN6, PYPAF7, RNO, RNO2, NLR family, pyrin domain containing 12, NLR family pyrin domain containing 12
- External IDs: OMIM: 609648; MGI: 2676630; GeneCards: NLRP12
Available structures
PDB	Ortholog search: PDBe RCSB
PDB	List of PDB id codes 2L6A, 4XHS

Gene location (Human)
Chr.	Chromosome 19 (human)
Band	19q13.42	Start	53,793,741 bp
Band	19q13.42	End	53,824,394 bp

Gene location (Mouse)
Chr.	Chromosome 7 (mouse)
Band	7|7 A1	Start	3,267,458 bp
Band	7|7 A1	End	3,298,370 bp
RNA expression pattern
Bgee	Human / Mouse (ortholog); Top expressed in: blood; monocyte; granulocyte; secondary oocyte; buccal mucosa cell; trabecular bone; bone marrow cell; spleen; appendix; right lung / Top expressed in: granulocyte; liver; morula; blastocyst; epiblast; placenta; bone marrow; yolk sac; spleen; lung; More reference expression data
BioGPS	n/a
Gene ontology
Molecular function	nucleotide binding; cysteine-type endopeptidase activator activity involved in apoptotic process; ATP binding; protein binding
Cellular component	cytoplasm; nucleus
Biological process	dendritic cell migration; regulation of cysteine-type endopeptidase activity involved in apoptotic process; regulation of I-kappaB kinase/NF-kappaB signaling; activation of cysteine-type endopeptidase activity involved in apoptotic process; negative regulation of Toll signaling pathway; signal transduction; negative regulation of NIK/NF-kappaB signaling; negative regulation of inflammatory response; cellular response to cytokine stimulus; negative regulation of I-kappaB kinase/NF-kappaB signaling; positive regulation of inflammatory response; negative regulation of protein autophosphorylation; positive regulation of MHC class I biosynthetic process; negative regulation of ERK1 and ERK2 cascade; negative regulation of NF-kappaB transcription factor activity; negative regulation of signal transduction; positive regulation of NIK/NF-kappaB signaling
Sources:Amigo / QuickGO
Orthologs
Databases	NCBI: entry; OMA: entry
Species	Human	Mouse
Entrez	91662	378425
Ensembl	ENSG00000142405	ENSMUSG00000078817
UniProt	P59046	E9Q5R7
RefSeq (mRNA)	NM_001277126; NM_001277129; NM_033297; NM_144687	NM_001033431
RefSeq (protein)	NP_001264055; NP_001264058; NP_653288	NP_001028603
Location (UCSC)	Chr 19: 53.79 – 53.82 Mb	Chr 7: 3.27 – 3.3 Mb
PubMed search
- Wikidata
View/Edit Human	View/Edit Mouse

NOD-like receptor|Nucleotide-binding oligomerization domain-like receptor (NLR) pyrin domain (PYD)-containing protein 12 (NLRP12; also known as NACHT, LRR and PYD domains-containing protein 12 or NALP12) is a protein that in humans is encoded by the NLRP12 gene.

NLRP12 is a cytoplasmic innate immune sensor belonging to the NLRP (NALP) subfamily of the larger CATERPILLER protein family. It participates in regulation of inflammatory signaling and may promote assembly of multiprotein signaling complexes including inflammasomes and PANoptosomes in a context-dependent manner.

== Structure ==
NLRPs, or NALPs, are cytoplasmic innate immune sensors that form a subfamily within the larger CATERPILLER protein family. Most short NLRP proteins, including NLRP12, contain an N-terminal pyrin (MEFV; MIM 608107) domain (PYD), followed by a NACHT domain, a NACHT-associated domain (NAD), and a C-terminal leucine-rich repeat (LRR) region. The long NALP, NALP1 (MIM 606636), additionally contains a function to find domain (FIIND) and a caspase recruitment domain (CARD).

== Function ==
NLRP12 functions as an innate immune cytosolic sensor and signaling molecule. It has been reported to act as both a positive and negative regulator of immune signaling depending on cellular and pathogenic context.

Some NLRPs, including NLRP12, are implicated in activation of proinflammatory caspases such as CASP1 through their participation in multiprotein inflammasome complexes. [supplied by OMIM].

NLRP12 can form multimeric protein signaling and cell death complexes including inflammasomes and PANoptosomes in response to specific stimuli.

In response to pathogens including Yersinia pestis and Plasmodium chabaudi, NLRP12 inflammasome activation promotes release of inflammatory cytokines IL-1β and IL-18, contributing to host defense.

NLRP12 also negatively regulates NF-kB and MAPK signaling pathways following infection with Salmonella enterica serovar Typhimurium, vesicular stomatitis virus, Klebsiella pneumoniae, and Mycobacterium tuberculosis.

NLRP12 additionally inhibits signaling in T cells and has been linked to modulation of inflammatory responses.

== Clinical significance ==
NLRP12 has been linked to infectious, inflammatory, and malignant conditions.

NLRP12 has been identified as an innate immune sensor that can trigger inflammatory cell death through PANoptosis, a lytic cell death pathway mediated through PANoptosomes and coordinated activity of caspases and receptor-interacting protein kinases (RIPKs).

Through activation of PANoptosis, NLRP12 has been implicated in pathology associated with heme exposure combined with infection or tissue injury. This process enables assembly of the NLRP12-PANoptosome and induction of cell death through caspase-8 and RIPK3. NLRP12 can additionally cooperate with other NLR proteins, including NLRC5 and NLRP3, in response to NAD^{+} depletion.

Expression of NLRP12 is elevated in hemolytic diseases including sickle cell disease and malaria and in infections including SARS-CoV-2, influenza, and bacterial pneumonia.

Deletion of Nlrp12 protects against pathology in animal models of hemolytic disease.
