= IFI16 =

Protein-coding gene in humans

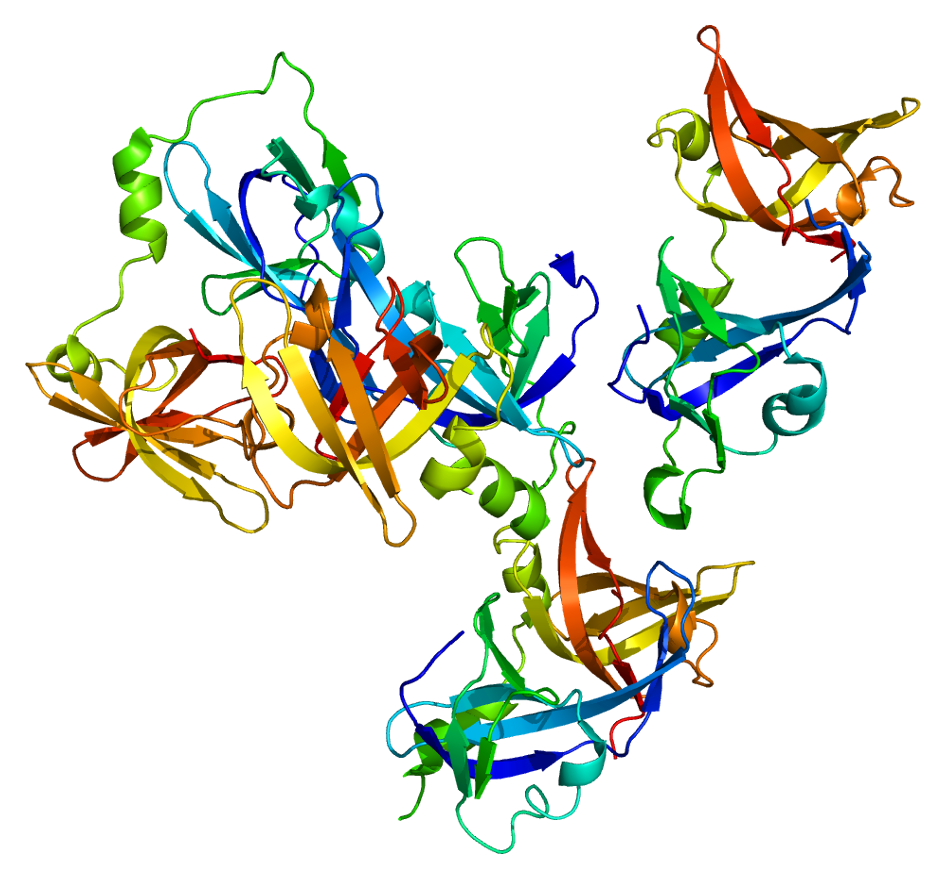

Identifiers
- Aliases: IFI16, IFNGIP1, PYHIN2, interferon gamma inducible protein 16
- External IDs: OMIM: 147586; MGI: 3695276; GeneCards: IFI16
Available structures
PDB	Human UniProt search: PDBe RCSB
PDB	List of PDB id codes 2OQ0, 3B6Y, 3RLN, 3RLO, 3RNU, 4QGU

Gene location (Human)
Chr.	Chromosome 1 (human)
Band	1q23.1	Start	158,999,968 bp
Band	1q23.1	End	159,055,155 bp

Gene location (Mouse)
Chr.	Chromosome 1 (mouse)
Band	1|1 H3	Start	173,393,849 bp
Band	1|1 H3	End	173,426,840 bp
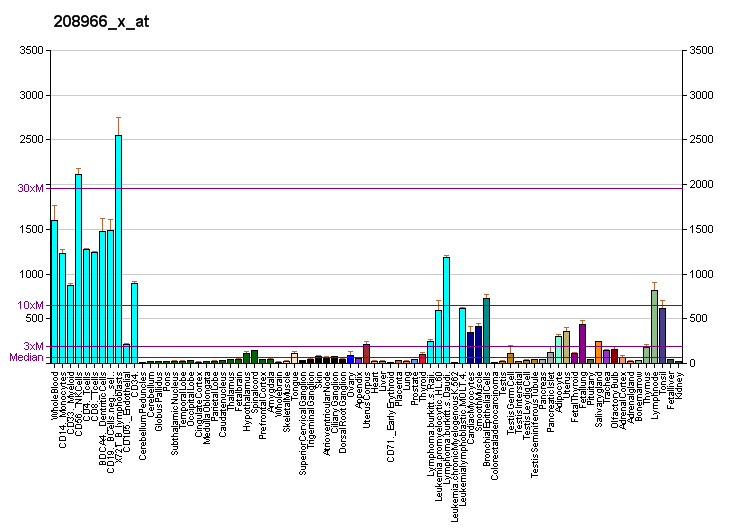

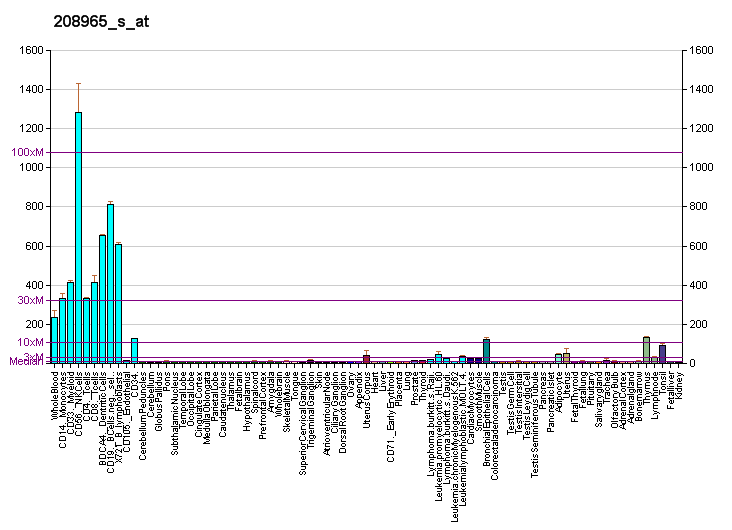

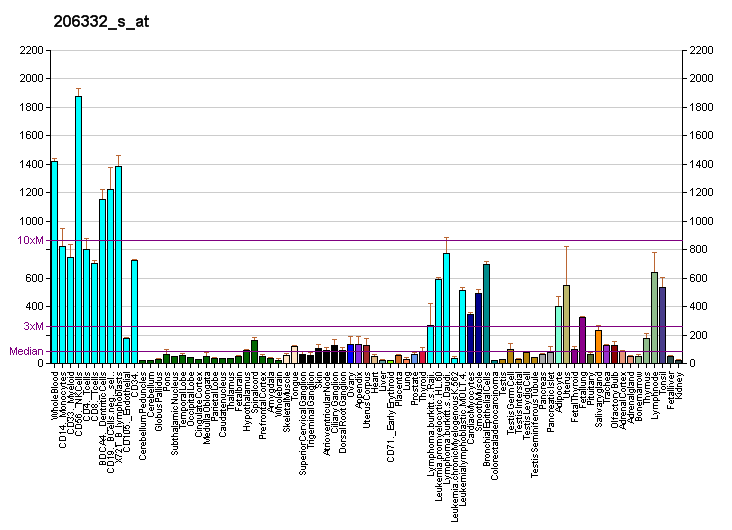
RNA expression pattern
Bgee	Human / Mouse (ortholog); Top expressed in: germinal epithelium; pericardium; palpebral conjunctiva; Achilles tendon; lymph node; superficial temporal artery; vena cava; mucosa of nose; spleen; human penis / Top expressed in: mesenteric lymph nodes; subcutaneous adipose tissue; spleen; thymus; bone marrow; white adipose tissue; blood; granulocyte; lumbar spinal ganglion; stroma of bone marrow; More reference expression data
BioGPS	More reference expression data
Gene ontology
Molecular function	DNA-binding transcription repressor activity, RNA polymerase II-specific; identical protein binding; double-stranded DNA binding; RNA polymerase II cis-regulatory region sequence-specific DNA binding; DNA binding; transcription factor binding; protein binding; RNA binding
Cellular component	nucleolus; nucleoplasm; nucleus; membrane; nuclear speck; cytoplasm; cytosol
Biological process	positive regulation of type I interferon production; positive regulation of cytokine production; intrinsic apoptotic signaling pathway by p53 class mediator; cellular response to glucose starvation; transcription, DNA-templated; negative regulation of viral genome replication; negative regulation of innate immune response; monocyte differentiation; cellular response to ionizing radiation; negative regulation of DNA binding; regulation of autophagy; myeloid cell differentiation; intrinsic apoptotic signaling pathway in response to DNA damage by p53 class mediator; apoptotic process; hemopoiesis; activation of cysteine-type endopeptidase activity; autophagy; negative regulation of cysteine-type endopeptidase activity; negative regulation of transcription by RNA polymerase II; positive regulation of interleukin-1 beta production; regulation of transcription, DNA-templated; regulation of gene expression, epigenetic; cell population proliferation; positive regulation of transcription by RNA polymerase II; activation of innate immune response; immune system process; inflammatory response; negative regulation of transcription, DNA-templated; innate immune response; defense response to virus; cellular response to interferon-beta
Sources:Amigo / QuickGO
Orthologs
Databases	NCBI: entry; OMA: entry
Species	Human	Mouse
Entrez	3428	623121
Ensembl	ENSG00000163565	ENSMUSG00000073491
UniProt	Q16666	n/a
RefSeq (mRNA)	NM_001206567; NM_005531; NM_001364867; NM_001376587; NM_001376588 NM_001376589; NM_001376591; NM_001376592	NM_001033384; NM_001177349; NM_001177350; NM_001368798; NM_001368799
RefSeq (protein)	NP_001193496; NP_005522; NP_001351796; NP_001363516; NP_001363517 NP_001363518; NP_001363520; NP_001363521	n/a
Location (UCSC)	Chr 1: 159 – 159.06 Mb	Chr 1: 173.39 – 173.43 Mb
PubMed search
- Wikidata
View/Edit Human	View/Edit Mouse

Gamma-interferon-inducible protein Ifi-16 (Ifi-16) also known as interferon-inducible myeloid differentiation transcriptional activator is a protein that in humans is encoded by the IFI16 gene.

== Function ==
This gene encodes a member of the HIN-200 (hematopoietic interferon-inducible nuclear antigens with 200 amino acid repeats) family of cytokines. The encoded protein contains domains involved in DNA binding, transcriptional regulation, and protein-protein interactions. The protein localizes to the nucleoplasm and nucleoli, and interacts with p53. It modulates p53 function, and inhibits cell growth in the Ras/Raf signaling pathway. IFI16 has been shown to play a role in the sensing of intracellular DNA—a hallmark of virally infected cells—and has also been linked to the death of HIV-infected helper CD4 T cells by pyroptosis, a highly inflammatory form of programmed cell death. Recently, it has been shown how IFI16, once extracellularly released, can induce inflammation upon TLR4 binding, acting as a DAMP.
