= NLRC5 =

Protein-coding gene in the species Homo sapiens

Available structures
PDB	Ortholog search: PDBe RCSB
PDB	List of PDB id codes 2MJM

Identifiers
- Aliases: NLRC5, CLR16.1, NOD27, NOD4, NLR family, CARD domain containing 5, NLR family CARD domain containing 5
- External IDs: OMIM: 613537; MGI: 3612191; HomoloGene: 88935; GeneCards: NLRC5; OMA:NLRC5 - orthologs

Gene location (Human)
Chr.	Chromosome 16 (human)
Band	16q13	Start	56,989,485 bp
Band	16q13	End	57,083,531 bp

Gene location (Mouse)
Chr.	Chromosome 8 (mouse)
Band	8|8 C5	Start	95,160,984 bp
Band	8|8 C5	End	95,253,900 bp
RNA expression pattern
Bgee	Human / Mouse (ortholog); Top expressed in: granulocyte; spleen; bone marrow cell; blood; appendix; lymph node; monocyte; mucosa of ileum; trabecular bone; epithelium of nasopharynx / Top expressed in: mesenteric lymph nodes; subcutaneous adipose tissue; blood; spleen; submandibular gland; thymus; Paneth cell; lens; white adipose tissue; skin of abdomen; More reference expression data
BioGPS	n/a
Gene ontology
Molecular function	nucleotide binding; protein binding; ATP binding; RNA polymerase II cis-regulatory region sequence-specific DNA binding
Cellular component	cytoplasm; centrosome; nucleus; cytosol
Biological process	positive regulation of type I interferon-mediated signaling pathway; negative regulation of type I interferon production; positive regulation of interferon-gamma-mediated signaling pathway; positive regulation of MHC class I biosynthetic process; positive regulation of transcription by RNA polymerase II; regulation of kinase activity; immune system process; innate immune response; negative regulation of NF-kappaB transcription factor activity; negative regulation of type I interferon-mediated signaling pathway; response to bacterium; intracellular signal transduction
Sources:Amigo / QuickGO
Orthologs
Species	Human	Mouse
Entrez	84166	434341
Ensembl	ENSG00000140853	ENSMUSG00000074151
UniProt	Q86WI3	C3VPR6
RefSeq (mRNA)	NM_032206; NM_001330552	NM_001033207
RefSeq (protein)	NP_001317481; NP_115582	NP_001028379
Location (UCSC)	Chr 16: 56.99 – 57.08 Mb	Chr 8: 95.16 – 95.25 Mb
PubMed search
- Wikidata
View/Edit Human	View/Edit Mouse

NLRC5, short for NOD-like receptor family CARD domain containing 5, is an intracellular protein that plays a role in the immune system. NLRC5 is a pattern recognition receptor implicated in innate immunity to viruses potentially by regulating interferon activity. It also acts as an innate immune sensor to drive inflammatory cell death, PANoptosis. In humans, the NLRC5 protein is encoded by the NLRC5 gene. It has also been called NOD27, NOD4, and CLR16.1.

== Structure ==
Structurally, NLRC5 has a putative caspase recruitment domain (CARD), followed by a NACHT domain, and a C-terminal leucine-rich repeat (LRR) region.

== Function ==
Through its structural features, NLRC5 acts as a key regulator of Major Histocompatibility Class I (MHCI) molecule expression, playing a significant role in the adaptive immune system. This aspect of NLRC5 function was further investigated with the help of Nlrc5-deficient mice, which showed reduced MHCI expression in lymphocytes (particularly T, NK and NKT lymphocytes). In lymphocytes, NLRC5 localizes to the nucleus and drives MHCI gene expression by occupying H-2D and H-2K gene promoters.

NLRC5 also functions as an innate immune sensor that, upon NAD^{+} depletion, forms a PANoptosome, driving PANoptosis and inflammation. PANoptosis is a prominent innate immune, inflammatory, and lytic cell death pathway initiated by innate immune sensors and driven by caspases and receptor-interacting protein kinases (RIPKs) through PANoptosomes. PANoptosomes are multi-protein complexes assembled by germline-encoded pattern-recognition receptor(s) (PRRs) (innate immune sensor(s)) in response to pathogens, including bacterial, viral, and fungal infections, as well as pathogen-associated molecular patterns, damage-associated molecular patterns, cytokines, and homeostatic changes during infections, inflammatory conditions, and cancer. NLRC5 forms a PANoptosome complex with other NLRs, including NLRP12 and NLRP3, in response to NAD^{+} depletion, driving PANoptosis via caspase-8 and RIPK3. Deletion of Nlrc5 protects mice from lethality in hemolytic, hemophagocytic lymphohistiocytosis, and colitis models.
