= Francisella novicida =

Scientific classification
- Domain: Bacteria
- Kingdom: Pseudomonadati
- Phylum: Pseudomonadota
- Class: Gammaproteobacteria
- Order: Thiotrichales
- Family: Francisellaceae
- Genus: Francisella
- Species: F. novicida

Binomial name
- Francisella novicida (Larson et al. 1955) Olsufiev et al. 1959 (Approved Lists 1980)

Species of bacterium

Francisella novicida is a bacterium of the Francisellaceae family, which consist of Gram-negative pathogenic bacteria. These bacteria vary from small cocci to rod-shaped, and are most known for their intracellular parasitic capabilities. In this family, six species have been identified; however, the species F. novicida is under intense scrutiny. Though some believe it should be classified with its own species designation, others argue it should be reclassified as a subspecies under F. tularensis. If it were to be classified as a subspecies, F. novicida would join the other known subspecies including F. t. tularensis (type A) and F. t. holarctica (type B). Biochemical assays for identifying F. tularensis subtypes and strains are not ideal because the results are often non-definitive and subject to variation, therefore these assays should only be considered as supplementary tests for identification of Francisella species and subspecies. Several strains of F. novicida or F. novicida-like bacteria have been described, and these strains may be resolved by PCR-based methods.

Though F. novicida is considered a rare pathogen, its close relative F. tularensis is well known for causing tularemia. Unlike F. tularensis, there have been no documented cases of F. novicida or F. novicida-like strain transmission to humans through arthropod bites. The route of infection for the majority of human F. novicida or F. novicida-'like' cases is unknown, although infected water or ice have been implicated. Some of the main symptoms associated with this infection include pneumonia, muscle pain, and fever, among many others. When reported, cases of F. novicida or F. novicida-like infections are most commonly seen in immunocompromised people. Though F. novicida is rarely associated with human illness despite the close genetic relationship to F. tularensis, cases have been reported in humans in the United States. For example, one case of F. novicida involved a woman in Arizona in 2009. Additionally, in 2011, three confirmed cases of F. novicida were found in a residential facility in Louisiana. In the later case, ice was the mode of transmission; however, how the ice was originally contaminated with the F. novicida is still unknown.

== Classification arguments ==
The transfer of F. novicida to a Francisella tularensis subsp. novicida has been recommended, and many microbiologists already use this name. Results of DNA-DNA hybridization and genome sequencing experiments indicate F. novicida is genetically close to F. tularensis. Also, the phenotypic differences observed are in agreement with the subspecies concept. From some scientists’ points of view, it is not consistent to have a species F. tularensis with three subspecies supported by the DNA-DNA hybridization data, but distinct by phenotypic traits and thus considered a separate species. The DNA-DNA relatedness was greater than 85%. Human or animal infections with F. t. novicida are very rare and few publications describe it, in part because it is infrequently isolated. This indicates most laboratories are not able to distinguish the two subspecies based on phenotype or metabolic requirements. For medically important organisms such as Francisella, clear guidelines exist for differentiation of subspecies. According to EU guideline 2000/54/EC, which has been adopted in 27 European countries, F. t. tularensis [F. tularensis (type A)] is classified as a BSL 3 pathogen, while F. t. holarctica [F. tularensis (type B)] is classified as a BSL 2 pathogen. Eleven metabolic reactions have been found to differ in F. novicida and F. tularensis. Many scientists argue this is not enough among the 98 traits to contradict F. novicida as a subspecies. It is common for bacterial species to be composed of individuals that are not identical in phenotypic traits. For example, the size of the Escherichia coli genome ranges from 4.6 to 5.7 Mb. This means the strains of a single species may differ in 20-25% of their genome without affecting their taxonomic status. Therefore, many believe more metabolic diversity is needed to distinguish the two as separate species. While all of this supports F. novicida to be classified as a subspecies, many still believe enough evidence exists to create a separate species.

When F. novicida and F. tularensis are grown, they appear to be morphologically very similar. They are both Gram-negative bacilli. Many tests have been done to try to distinguish if F. novicida and F. tularensis should be considered separate species. One of these tests involved growth on cysteine-glucose-blood agar (CGBA). F. tularensis took 2 to 7 days to appear on the CGBA, while F. novicida took only 24 hours to appear. Another difference between the two is the virulence of F. novicida was lower. F. tularensis was highly virulent in the mice and cavies (guinea pigs) used in studies. It only took one to 10 cells of F. tularensis to kill the animal of either species, although F. novicida took 10 to 100 cells in cavies and up to a 1,000 cells in mice. The immunological differences, though, are the strongest evidence used to support the idea that F. novicida and F. tularensis are separate species. Nonliving vaccines provided no protection against the heterologous organism. However, these nonliving vaccines did provide protection against the homologous organism. The living vaccines provided protection and cross-protection. as well. No protection was demonstrated against F. tularensis when using an F. novicida vaccine in any experiment. Therefore, a fundamental difference appears to exist in the antigenic composition of the two organisms, which was also demonstrated by cross-absorption in passive cutaneous anaphylaxis test (PCAs). The ability of the given antigen to remove all reactivity from its homologous antiserum while leaving the heterologous antiserum intact indicates the lack of antigen identity. To many scientists, this is enough proof to consider F. novicida and F. tularensis as separate species. Much debate still occurs over how to classify the two organisms, and it is important for scientists to establish a species concept for this organism due to its medical relevance.
