= NLRP =

Part of the human immune system

NLRP (Nucleotide-binding oligomerization domain, Leucine rich Repeat and Pyrin domain containing), also abbreviated as NALP, is a type of NOD-like receptor. NOD-like receptors are a type of pattern recognition receptor that are found in the cytosol of the cell, recognizing signals of antigens in the cell. NLRP proteins are part of the innate immune system and detect conserved pathogen characteristics, or pathogen-associated molecular patterns, such as such as peptidoglycan, which is found on some bacterial cells. It is thought that NLRP proteins sense danger signals linked to microbial products, initiating the processes associated with the activation of the inflammasome, including K^{+} efflux and caspase 1 activation. NLRPs are also known to be associated with a number of diseases. Research suggests NLRP proteins may be involved in combating retroviruses in gametes. As of now, there are at least 14 different known NLRP genes in humans, which are named NLRP1 through NLRP14. The genes translate into proteins with differing lengths of leucine-rich repeat domains.

== Function ==
NLRP plays a key role in inflammation. It is a scaffolding protein and is crucial for aggregating other proteins that form the inflammasome. NLRP1, 3, 6, 7, and 12 are known to be involved in the formation of inflammasomes. NOD-like receptors, in general, activate caspase-1 and assist in the maturation of the proinflammatory cytokines IL-1β and IL-18. However, not every NLRP forms an inflammasome and activates caspase-1; these NLRPs are referred to as non-canonical NLRPs.

As with other NOD-like receptors, NLRPs function to recognize danger signals, which consist of pathogen-associated molecular patterns (PAMPs) or danger-associated molecular patterns (DAMPs), which are present when tissue is damaged or under stress. NRLP3, which is well studied relative to the other NLRP genes, has been observed to play a significant role propagating immune response to aluminum in adjuvants. NLRP3 is involved in the immune response to toxins in the environment. For example, NLRP3 is activated to form an inflammasome when liver cells are exposed to DBP, a chemical used in plastic toys and food packaging. Similar to its response to toxins, NLRP3 also plays a role in the inflammation that follows exposure to various allergens, thus leading to the activation of T helper 2 cells, which are responsible for the activation of allergic reactions.

Many NLRPs regulate the activation of NF-κB, which is a transcription factor that leads to the production of various pro-inflammatory cytokines, such as IL-1 and TNF-α. For example, NLRP11, NLRP5, NLRP2, and NLRP12 have been shown to inhibit different steps in the NF-κB pathway, while there are other NLRPs that activate the pathway.

Some NLRPs are thought to be maternal-effect genes, which are genes present in the developing egg and contribute to the early growth of an embryo. Specific NLRPs are highly expressed at certain points during embryo development and play different proles. NLRP5, for example, is a part of the human subcortical maternal complex, which is needed for the growth of the zygote in the early stages of cell division.

== Structure ==
NLRP protein structure has a N-terminal PYD domain followed by NACHT domain and several leucine-rich repeats (LRR). These PYD domains can interact with other PYD domains to allow for interaction between NRLP and other proteins also containing a PYD domain. Pyrin domains recruit the scaffold protein that activates the inflammasome.

== Expression ==
NLRPs are expressed in various parts of the body. These receptors are expressed in white blood cells, aiding the inflammation process upon activation by pathogen-associated molecular patterns, toxins, etc. NLRPs are also expressed in many other locations in humans. For example, NLRP1 was found in the neurons of the brain, including pyramidal cells. NLRP1 is also expressed in the oligodendrocytes, which are cells in the central nervous system that myelinate neurons. NLRP1 has many alleles across the population, making it a very polymorphic gene. NLRP6 is highly expressed in the intestine and is involved in fighting viral intestinal infections.

A number of NLRPs, such as NLRP10, NLRP3, and NLRP1, are expressed in the keratinocytes, or the keratin-producing cells in the epidermis. NLRP10 prevents inflammation in the skin, while NLRP1 and 3 activate the inflammasome. In humans, the exposure to UVB rays can activate NLRP1, leading to sunburn.

== NRLP gene ==
In humans, NLRPs are primarily found on two chromosomes: 11p15, which contains NLRP6, 10, and 14, and 19q13.4, which contains the rest of the NLRP genes, excluding NLRP1 and 3. The majority of the NLRPs that are associated with reproduction, many of which are maternal-effect genes, are found on chromosome 19, excluding NLRP14. NLRP1 and NLRP3 are found on chromosomes 17p13.2 and 1q44, respectively.

== Associated diseases ==
Many of the diseases known to be associated with NLRPs are due to NLRP3. For example, Muckle-Wells syndrome (MWS), Familial Cold Autoinflammatory syndrome (FCAS), and Chronic Infantile Neurological Cutaneous Articular syndrome (CINCA) are all consequences of mutations in the NLRP3 gene. The pathology of these diseases involves the increase in the release of IL-1, leading to inflammation. NLRP3 has also been implicated in the development of diseases such as cancer, inflammatory bowel disease, and gout.

Both NLRP1 and NLRP3 are involved in neurodegeneration. Amyloid beta aggregation and oligomerization, which is found in individuals with Alzheimer's disease, activates the inflammasomes from NLRP1 and 3. Caspase activity that is triggered by the NLRP1 inflammasome activates caspase-6, which destroys the axons of neurons.

== Role in plants ==
Plants also recognize danger signals, and it is thought that plants utilize receptors similar to NLRPs to detect these signals. Plant nod-like receptors, however, differ from human NLRs in that some of the domains of the protein are different. For example, the pyrin domain of NLRPs is replaced by either a coiled-coil domain or a toll and interleukin receptor. Likewise, the NACHT domain in human NLRs is instead the nucleotide binding domain in the plant NLR.

== Genes ==
Some NLRP genes code for a series of NACHT, LRR and PYD domains-containing proteins, including:

- NLRP1, a human gene that encodes the NACHT, LRR and PYD domains-containing protein 1
- NLRP2, a human gene that encodes the NACHT, LRR and PYD domains-containing protein 2
- NLRP3, a human gene that encodes the NACHT, LRR and PYD domains-containing protein 3
- NLRP4, a human gene that encodes the NACHT, LRR and PYD domains-containing protein 4
- NLRP7, a human gene that encodes the NACHT, LRR and PYD domains-containing protein 7
- NLRP12, a human gene that encodes the NACHT, LRR and PYD domains-containing protein 12

Some NLRP genes encode a series of NOD-like receptor family pyrin domains, including:

- NLRP5, a human gene that encodes the NOD-like receptor family pyrin domain containing 5
- NLRP6, a human gene that encodes the NOD-like receptor family pyrin domain containing 6
- NLRP8, a human gene that encodes the NOD-like receptor family pyrin domain containing 8
- NLRP9, a human gene that encodes the NOD-like receptor family pyrin domain containing 9
- NLRP10, a human gene that encodes the NOD-like receptor family pyrin domain containing 10
- NLRP11, a human gene that encodes the NOD-like receptor family pyrin domain containing 11
- NLRP13, a human gene that encodes the NOD-like receptor family pyrin domain containing 13
- NLRP14, a human gene that encodes the NOD-like receptor family pyrin domain containing 14
