= NACHT domain =

Identifiers
- Symbol: NACHT
- Pfam: PF05729
- InterPro: IPR007111
- PROSITE: PS50837
Available protein structures:
- Pfam: structures / ECOD
- PDB: RCSB PDB; PDBe; PDBj
- PDBsum: structure summary

The NACHT domain is an evolutionarily conserved protein domain. This NTPase domain is found in apoptosis proteins as well as those involved in MHC transcription. Its name reflects some of the proteins that contain it: NAIP (NLP family apoptosis inhibitor protein), CIITA (that is, C2TA or MHC class II transcription activator), HET-E (incompatibility locus protein from Podospora anserina) and TEP1 (that is, TP1 or telomerase-associated protein).

The NACHT domain contains 300 to 400 amino acids. It is a predicted nucleoside-triphosphatase (NTPase) domain, which is found in animal, fungal and bacterial proteins. It is found in association with other domains, such as the caspase recruitment domain (InterPro: IPR001315), the pyrin domain (InterPro: IPR004020), the HEAT repeat domain (InterPro: IPR004155), the WD40 repeat (InterPro: IPR001680), the leucine-rich repeat (LRR) or the BIR repeat (InterPro: IPR001370).

The NACHT domain consists of seven distinct conserved motifs, including the ATP/GTPase specific P-loop, the Mg^{2+}-binding site (Walker A and B motifs, respectively) and five more specific motifs. The unique features of the NACHT domain include the prevalence of 'tiny' residues (glycine, alanine or serine) directly C-terminal of the Mg^{2+}-coordinating aspartate in the Walker B motif, in place of a second acidic residue prevalent in other NTPases. A second acidic residue is typically found in the NACHT-containing proteins two positions downstream. Furthermore, the distal motif VII contains a conserved pattern of polar, aromatic and hydrophobic residues that is not seen in any other NTPase family.

== Examples ==
Human proteins containing this domain include:

- CIITA
- NAIP
- NLRC3, NLRC4, NLRC5
- NLRP1, NLRP2, NLRP3, NLRP4, NLRP5, NLRP6, NLRP7, NLRP8, NLRP9, NLRP10, NLRP11, NLRP12, NLRP13, NLRP14, NLRX1
- NOD1, NOD2
- NWD1
- TEP1
