= IPAF =

IPAF may refer to:

- International Prize for Arabic Fiction
- IPAF, a family of NOD-like receptors
