= Nodosome =

Nodosome refers to protein complexes involving pattern recognition receptors and intracellular pathogen sensors NOD2 and CARD8. Their activation leads to regulation of caspase-1 and NF-kappa-B.

== See also ==
- Inflammasome
- Innate immunity
