= NOD-like receptor =

Class of proteins

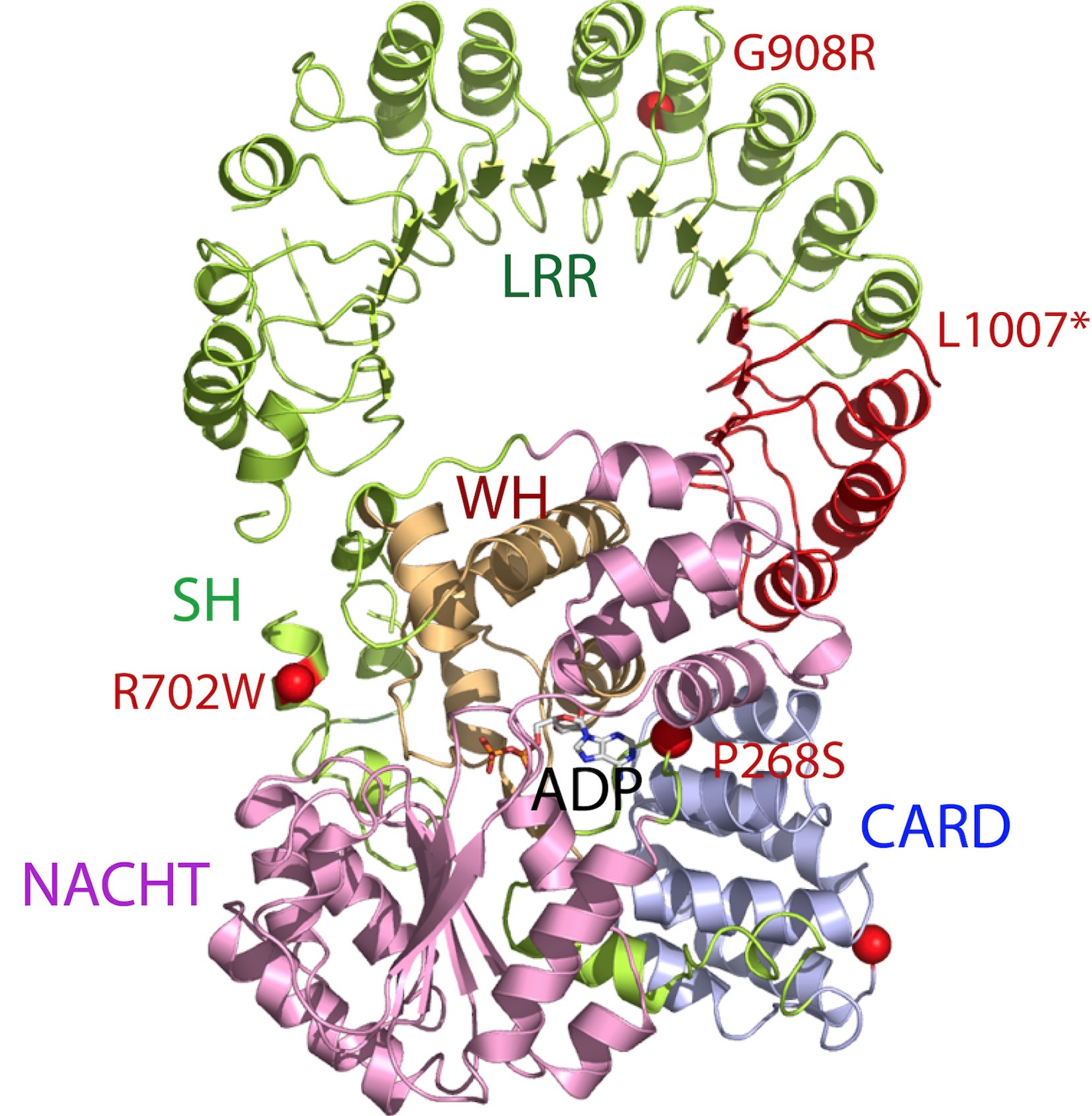
Structure and domain organization of NOD2, a human NOD-like receptor

The nucleotide-binding oligomerization domain-like receptors, or NOD-like receptors (NLRs) (also known as nucleotide-binding leucine-rich repeat receptors), are intracellular sensors of pathogen-associated molecular patterns (PAMPs) that enter the cell via phagocytosis or pores, and damage-associated molecular patterns (DAMPs) that are associated with cell stress. They are types of pattern recognition receptors (PRRs), and play key roles in the regulation of innate immune response. NLRs can cooperate with toll-like receptors (TLRs) and regulate inflammatory and apoptotic response.

NLRs primarily recognize Gram-positive bacteria, whereas TLRs primarily recognize Gram-negative bacteria. They are found in lymphocytes, macrophages, dendritic cells and also in non-immune cells, for example in epithelium. NLRs are highly conserved through evolution. Their homologs have been discovered in many different animal species (APAF1) and also in the plant kingdom (disease-resistance R protein).

== Structure ==
NLRs contain three domains – a central NACHT (NOD or NBD – nucleotide-binding domain) domain, which is common to all NLRs, while most NLRs also have a C-terminal leucine-rich repeat (LRR) and a variable N-terminal interaction domain. The NACHT domain mediates ATP-dependent self-oligomerization and LRR senses the presence of ligand. The N-terminal domain is responsible for homotypic protein-protein interaction and it can consist of caspase recruitment domain (CARD), pyrin domain (PYD), acidic transactivating domain or baculovirus inhibitor repeats (BIRs).

== Nomenclature and system ==
Names as CATERPILLER, NOD, NALP, PAN, NACHT, PYPAF were used to describe the NLRs family. The nomenclature was unified by the HUGO Gene Nomenclature Committee in 2008. The family was characterized as NLRs to provide description of the families features – NLR means nucleotide-binding domain and leucine-rich repeat containing gene family.

This system divides NLRs into 4 subfamilies based on the type of N-terminal domain:

- NLRA (A for acidic transactivating domain): CIITA
- NLRB (B for BIRs): NAIP
- NLRC (C for CARD): NOD1, NOD2, NLRC3, NLRC4, NLRC5
- NLRP (P for PYD): NLRP1, NLRP2, NLRP3, NLRP4, NLRP5, NLRP6, NLRP7, NLRP8, NLRP9, NLRP10, NLRP11, NLRP12, NLRP13, NLRP14

There is also an additional subfamily NLRX which doesn't have significant homology to any N-terminal domain. A member of this subfamily is NLRX1.

On the other hand, NLRs can be divided into 3 subfamilies with regard to their phylogenetic relationships:

- NODs: NOD1, NOD2, NOD3 (NLRC3), NOD4 (NLRC5), NOD5 (NLRX1), CIITA
- NLRPs (also called NALPs): NLRP1, NLRP2, NLRP3, NLRP4, NLRP5, NLRP6, NLRP7, NLRP8, NLRP9, NLRP10, NLRP11, NLRP12, NLRP13, NLRP14
- IPAF: IPAF (NLRC4), NAIP

== Subfamily NODs ==
NODs subfamily consists of NOD1, NOD2, NOD3, NOD4 with CARD domain, CIITA containing acidic transactivator domain and NOD5 without any N-terminal domain.

=== Signalling ===
The well-described receptors are NOD1 and NOD2. The recognition of their ligands recruits oligomerization of NACHT domain and CARD-CARD interaction with CARD-containing serine-threonin kinase RIP2 which leads to activation of RIP2. RIP2 mediates the recruitment of kinase TAK1 which phosphorylates and activates IκB kinase. The activation of IκB kinase results in the phosphorylation of inhibitor IκB which releases NF-κB and its nuclear translocation. NF-κB then activates expression of inflammatory cytokines. Mutations in NOD2 are associated with Crohn's disease or Blau syndrome.

=== Ligands ===
NOD1 and NOD2 recognize peptidoglycan motifs from bacterial cell which consists of N-acetylglucosamine and N-acetylmuramic acid. These sugar chains are cross-linked by peptide chains that can be sensed by NODs. NOD1 recognizes a molecule called meso-diaminopimelic acid (meso-DAP) mostly found in Gram-negative bacteria (for example Helicobacter pylori, Pseudomonas aeruginosa). NOD2 proteins can sense intracellular muramyl dipeptide (MDP), typical for bacteria such as Streptococcus pneumoniae or Mycobacterium tuberculosis.

== Subfamilies NLRPs and IPAF ==
NLRPs subfamily contains NLRP1-NLRP14 that are characterized by the presence of PYD domain. IPAF subfamily has two members – IPAF with CARD domain and NAIP with BIR domain.

=== Signalization ===
NLRPs and IPAF subfamilies are involved in the formation of the inflammasome. The best characterized inflammasome is NLRP3, the activation through PAMPs or DAMPs leads to the oligomerization. The pyrin domain of NLRs binds to an adaptor protein ASC (PYCARD) via PYD-PYD interaction. ASC contains PYD and CARD domain and links the NLRs to inactive form of caspase 1 through the CARD domain. All these protein-protein interaction form a complex called the inflammasome. The aggregation of the pro-caspase-1 causes the autocleavage and formation of an active enzyme. Caspase-1 is important for the proteolytic processing of the pro-inflammatory cytokines IL-1β and IL-18. NLRP3 mutations are responsible for the autoinflammatory disease familial cold autoinflammatory syndrome or Muckle–Wells syndrome.

=== Ligands ===
There are three well-characterized inflammasomes – NLRP1, NLRP3 and IPAF. The formation of NLRP3 inflammasome can be activated by PAMPs such as microbial toxins (for example alpha-toxin of Staphylococcus aureus) or whole pathogens, for instance Candida albicans, Saccharomyces cerevisiae, Sendai virus, Influenza. NLRP3 recognize also DAMPs which indicate stress in the cell. The danger molecule can be extracellular ATP, extracellular glucose, monosodium urate (MSU) crystals, calcium pyrophosphate dihydrate (CPPD), alum, cholesterol or environmental irritants – silica, asbestos, UV irradiation and skin irritants. The presence of these molecules causes a production of ROS and K+ efflux. NLRP1 recognizes lethal toxin from Bacillus anthracis and muramyl dipeptide. IPAF senses flagellin from Salmonella typhimurium, Pseudomonas aeruginosa, Listeria monocytogenes.

== See also ==
- Toll-like receptor
- Inflammasome
- RIG-I-like receptor
