= NLRP10 =

Protein-coding gene in the species Homo sapiens

Identifiers
- Aliases: NLRP10, CLR11.1, NALP10, NOD8, PAN5, PYNOD, NLR family, pyrin domain containing 10, NLR family pyrin domain containing 10
- External IDs: OMIM: 609662; MGI: 2444084; GeneCards: NLRP10
Available structures
PDB	Ortholog search: PDBe RCSB
PDB	List of PDB id codes 2M5V

Gene location (Human)
Chr.	Chromosome 11 (human)
Band	11p15.4	Start	7,957,537 bp
Band	11p15.4	End	7,965,447 bp

Gene location (Mouse)
Chr.	Chromosome 7 (mouse)
Band	7|7 E3	Start	108,521,059 bp
Band	7|7 E3	End	108,529,385 bp
RNA expression pattern
Bgee	Human / Mouse (ortholog); Top expressed in: skin of leg; testicle; skin of abdomen; stromal cell of endometrium; placenta; Achilles tendon; appendix; gastrocnemius muscle; lactiferous gland; smooth muscle tissue / Top expressed in: interventricular septum; esophagus; lip; skin of external ear; myocardium of ventricle; skin of back; umbilical cord; atrioventricular valve; skin of abdomen; atrium; More reference expression data
BioGPS	n/a
Gene ontology
Molecular function	nucleotide binding; ATP binding; GTPase activity; ATPase activity
Cellular component	plasma membrane; extrinsic component of plasma membrane; membrane; cytoplasm
Biological process	innate immune response; adaptive immune response; defense response to Gram-negative bacterium; immune system process; positive regulation of T-helper 17 type immune response; defense response to fungus; positive regulation of T-helper 1 type immune response; positive regulation of inflammatory response; positive regulation of defense response to bacterium; inflammatory response
Sources:Amigo / QuickGO
Orthologs
Databases	NCBI: entry; OMA: entry
Species	Human	Mouse
Entrez	338322	244202
Ensembl	ENSG00000276780; ENSG00000281166; ENSG00000182261	ENSMUSG00000049709
UniProt	Q86W26	Q8CCN1
RefSeq (mRNA)	NM_176821; NM_001391958	NM_175532
RefSeq (protein)	NP_789791	NP_780741
Location (UCSC)	Chr 11: 7.96 – 7.97 Mb	Chr 7: 108.52 – 108.53 Mb
PubMed search
- Wikidata
View/Edit Human	View/Edit Mouse

NLRP10, short for NOD-like receptor family pyrin domain containing 10, is an intracellular protein of mammals that functions in apoptosis and the immune system. It is also known as NALP10, NOD8, PAN5, Pynod, and CLR11.1, and is one of 14 pyrin domain containing members of the NOD-like receptor family of cytoplasmic receptors, although it differs from other NOD-like receptors by lacking the characteristic leucine-rich repeat domain. It is also believed that it helps regulate the inflammatory response. NLRP10 reduces inflammatory and innate immune responses by inhibiting the activity of two proteins associated with the inflammasome; caspase-1 and PYCARD.
