= NLRP6 =

Protein-coding gene in the species Homo sapiens

Identifiers
- Aliases: NLRP6, AVR, CLR11.4, NALP6, NAVR, NAVR/AVR, PAN3, PYPAF5, NLR family, pyrin domain containing 6, NLR family pyrin domain containing 6
- External IDs: OMIM: 609650; MGI: 2141990; GeneCards: NLRP6

Gene location (Human)
Chr.	Chromosome 11 (human)
Band	11p15.5	Start	278,407 bp
Band	11p15.5	End	285,388 bp

Gene location (Mouse)
Chr.	Chromosome 7 (mouse)
Band	7|7 F5	Start	140,500,815 bp
Band	7|7 F5	End	140,509,105 bp
RNA expression pattern
Bgee	Human / Mouse (ortholog); Top expressed in: blood; granulocyte; right lobe of liver; spleen; appendix; duodenum; left uterine tube; right lung; monocyte; lymph node / Top expressed in: Paneth cell; jejunum; crypt of lieberkuhn of small intestine; left lobe of liver; duodenum; colon; ileum; right kidney; intestinal villus; left colon; More reference expression data
BioGPS	n/a
Gene ontology
Molecular function	nucleotide binding; vasopressin receptor activity; ATP binding
Cellular component	cytoplasm; nuclear membrane; membrane; plasma membrane; inflammasome complex; nucleus
Biological process	response to bacterium; immune system process; wound healing; regulation of mucus secretion; negative regulation of I-kappaB kinase/NF-kappaB signaling; negative regulation of immune response; regulation of autophagy; negative regulation of toll-like receptor signaling pathway; negative regulation of inflammatory response to antigenic stimulus; regulation of inflammatory response; negative regulation of MAPK cascade; negative regulation of ERK1 and ERK2 cascade; innate immune response; inflammatory response; G protein-coupled receptor signaling pathway
Sources:Amigo / QuickGO
Orthologs
Databases	NCBI: entry; OMA: entry
Species	Human	Mouse
Entrez	171389	101613
Ensembl	ENSG00000174885	ENSMUSG00000038745
UniProt	P59044	Q91WS2
RefSeq (mRNA)	NM_001276700; NM_138329	NM_001081389; NM_133946
RefSeq (protein)	NP_001263629; NP_612202	NP_598707
Location (UCSC)	Chr 11: 0.28 – 0.29 Mb	Chr 7: 140.5 – 140.51 Mb
PubMed search
- Wikidata
View/Edit Human	View/Edit Mouse

NLRP6, short for NOD-like receptor family pyrin domain containing 6, is an intracellular protein that plays a role in the immune system. It is also known as NALP6, PYPAF5, PAN3, and CLR11.4, and is one of 14 pyrin domain containing members of the NOD-like receptor family of pattern recognition receptors. As with several other NOD-like receptors, NLRP6's role in immunity is related to its ability to regulate caspase-1 and NF-κB activity.
