= CARD16 =

Protein-coding gene in humans

Identifiers
- Aliases: CARD16, COP, COP1, PSEUDO-ICE, caspase recruitment domain family member 16, LLID-114769
- External IDs: OMIM: 615680; GeneCards: CARD16

Gene location (Human)
Chr.	Chromosome 11 (human)
Band	11q22.3	Start	105,041,326 bp
Band	11q22.3	End	105,101,431 bp
RNA expression pattern
Bgee	Human / Mouse (ortholog); Top expressed in: monocyte; granulocyte; stromal cell of endometrium; spleen; appendix; germinal epithelium; bone marrow; bone marrow cell; mucosa of transverse colon; superficial temporal artery / n/a; More reference expression data
BioGPS	n/a
Gene ontology
Molecular function	peptidase inhibitor activity; protein binding; kinase binding; identical protein binding; caspase binding; CARD domain binding; cysteine-type endopeptidase inhibitor activity; cysteine-type endopeptidase activity
Cellular component	protease inhibitor complex; protein-containing complex
Biological process	regulation of apoptotic process; negative regulation of peptidase activity; negative regulation of lipopolysaccharide-mediated signaling pathway; negative regulation of protein binding; positive regulation of NF-kappaB transcription factor activity; inhibition of cysteine-type endopeptidase activity; negative regulation of tumor necrosis factor-mediated signaling pathway; negative regulation of cysteine-type endopeptidase activity involved in apoptotic process; cellular response to hypoxia; cellular response to UV-C; positive regulation of I-kappaB kinase/NF-kappaB signaling; cellular response to lipopolysaccharide; proteolysis
Sources:Amigo / QuickGO
Orthologs
Databases	NCBI: entry; OMA: entry
Species	Human	Mouse
Entrez	114769	n/a
Ensembl	ENSG00000204397	n/a
UniProt	Q5EG05	n/a
RefSeq (mRNA)	NM_001017534; NM_052889; NM_001394580	n/a
RefSeq (protein)	NP_001017534; NP_443121	n/a
Location (UCSC)	Chr 11: 105.04 – 105.1 Mb	n/a
PubMed search		n/a
- Wikidata
View/Edit Human

Caspase recruitment domain-containing protein 16 is an enzyme that in humans is encoded by the CARD16 gene (previously called COP1). It functions as a caspase inhibitor, in particular inhibiting the activation of caspase 1 and caspase 4.
