= NLRX1 =

Protein-coding gene in the species Homo sapiens

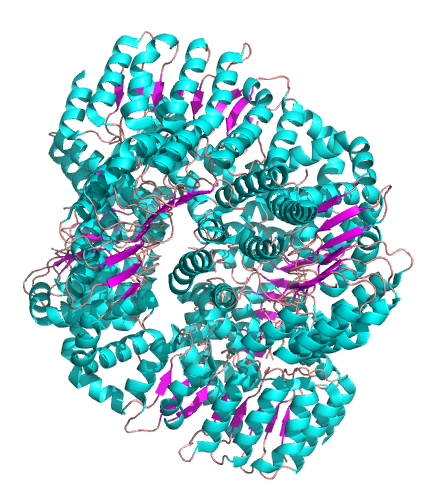
Available structures
PDB	Ortholog search: PDBe RCSB
PDB	List of PDB id codes 3UN9

Identifiers
- Aliases: NLRX1, CLR11.3, DLNB26, NOD26, NOD5, NOD9, NLR family member X1
- External IDs: OMIM: 611947; MGI: 2429611; HomoloGene: 11623; GeneCards: NLRX1; OMA:NLRX1 - orthologs

Gene location (Human)
Chr.	Chromosome 11 (human)
Band	11q23.3	Start	119,166,568 bp
Band	11q23.3	End	119,184,016 bp

Gene location (Mouse)
Chr.	Chromosome 9 (mouse)
Band	9|9 A5.2	Start	44,164,014 bp
Band	9|9 A5.2	End	44,179,896 bp
RNA expression pattern
Bgee	Human / Mouse (ortholog); Top expressed in: epithelium of esophagus; human penis; vulva; mucosa of pharynx; apex of heart; gingival epithelium; oral cavity; muscle of thigh; skin of arm; triceps brachii muscle / Top expressed in: granulocyte; superior surface of tongue; gallbladder; Ileal epithelium; hair follicle; ankle joint; conjunctival fornix; muscle of thigh; blood; plantaris muscle; More reference expression data
BioGPS	n/a
Gene ontology
Molecular function	nucleotide binding; protein binding; ATP binding
Cellular component	mitochondrial outer membrane; membrane; mitochondrion; plasma membrane; cell junction; cytoplasm
Biological process	negative regulation of interleukin-6 production; negative regulation of type I interferon production; viral process; negative regulation of inflammatory response; negative regulation of interferon-beta production; negative regulation of RIG-I signaling pathway; negative regulation of I-kappaB kinase/NF-kappaB signaling; immune system process; negative regulation of innate immune response; innate immune response; intracellular signal transduction
Sources:Amigo / QuickGO
Orthologs
Species	Human	Mouse
Entrez	79671	270151
Ensembl	ENSG00000160703	ENSMUSG00000032109
UniProt	Q86UT6	Q3TL44
RefSeq (mRNA)	NM_001282143; NM_001282144; NM_001282358; NM_024618; NM_170722	NM_001163742; NM_001163743; NM_178420
RefSeq (protein)	NP_001269072; NP_001269073; NP_001269287; NP_078894	NP_001157214; NP_001157215; NP_848507
Location (UCSC)	Chr 11: 119.17 – 119.18 Mb	Chr 9: 44.16 – 44.18 Mb
PubMed search
- Wikidata
View/Edit Human	View/Edit Mouse

NLRX1 or NLR family member X1, short for nucleotide-binding oligomerization domain, leucine rich repeat containing X1 is a protein that in humans is encoded by the NLRX1 gene. It is also known as NOD-like receptor X1, NLR family, X1, NOD5, NOD9, and CLR11.3, and is a member of the NOD-like receptor family of pattern recognition receptors.

== Function ==
NLRX1 is an intracellular protein that plays a role in the immune system. NLRX1 has been proposed to affect innate immunity to viruses by interfering with the mitochondrial antiviral signaling protein (MAVS)/retinoic-acid-inducible gene I (RIG-I) mitochondrial antiviral pathway., although this was recently questioned.

NLRX1 also plays a role in host immunity during bacterial infections, such as Chlamydia trachomatis and Helicobacter pylori, by regulating bacterial burden and inflammation in mononuclear phagocytes. Mechanisms underlying the modulation of NLRX1 are not well characterized, however computational modeling predictions suggest that levels of NLRX1 may be controlled by negative feedback circuits induced early after infection.

== Structure ==
NLRX1 has a unique protein structure composed of 3 protein domains: an N-terminal effector domain containing a mitochondrion localization signal; a central NACHT domain; a C-terminal leucine-rich repeat (LRR) domain.
