= Belnacasan =

Chemical compound

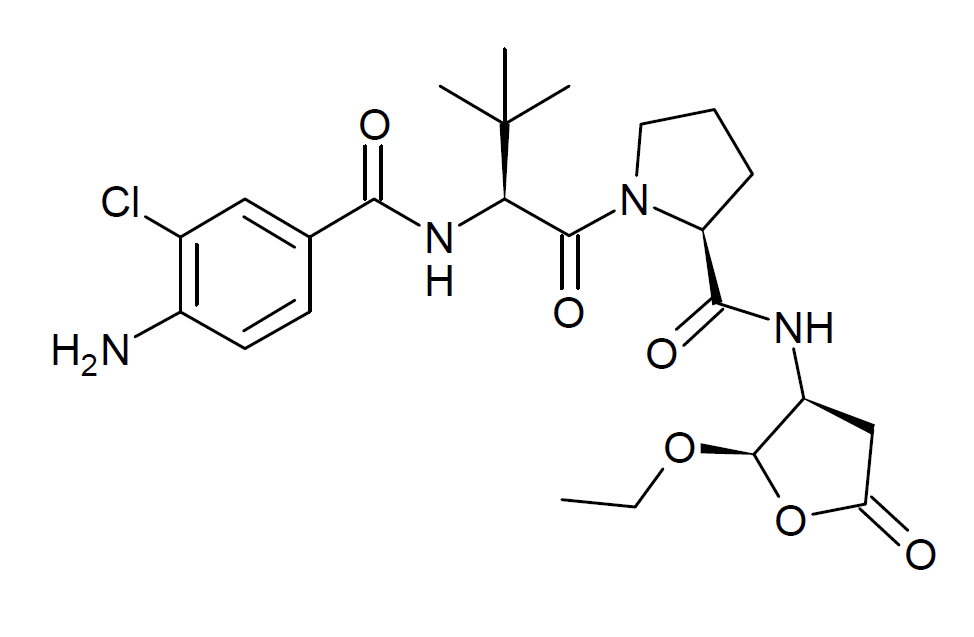

Clinical data
- Routes of administration: Oral

Identifiers
- IUPAC name: (2S)-1-[(2S)-2-[(4-amino-3-chlorobenzoyl)amino]-3,3-dimethylbutanoyl]-N-[(2R,3S)-2-ethoxy-5-oxooxolan-3-yl]pyrrolidine-2-carboxamide
- CAS Number: 273404-37-8
- PubChem CID: 11398092
- ChemSpider: 9572992
- UNII: 00OLE78529
- KEGG: D10416
- CompTox Dashboard (EPA): DTXSID901017651

Chemical and physical data
- Formula: C_{24}H_{33}ClN_{4}O_{6}
- Molar mass: 509.00 g·mol^{−1}
- 3D model (JSmol): Interactive image
- SMILES: CCO[C@@H]3OC(=O)C[C@@H]3NC(=O)[C@@H]2CCCN2C(=O)[C@@H](NC(=O)c1ccc(N)c(Cl)c1)C(C)(C)C
- InChI: InChI=1S/C24H33ClN4O6/c1-5-34-23-16(12-18(30)35-23)27-21(32)17-7-6-10-29(17)22(33)19(24(2,3)4)28-20(31)13-8-9-15(26)14(25)11-13/h8-9,11,16-17,19,23H,5-7,10,12,26H2,1-4H3,(H,27,32)(H,28,31)/t16-,17-,19+,23+/m0/s1; Key:SJDDOCKBXFJEJB-MOKWFATOSA-N

Belnacasan (VX-765) is a drug developed by Vertex Pharmaceuticals which acts as a potent and selective inhibitor of the enzyme caspase 1. This enzyme is involved in inflammation and cell death, and consequently blocking its action may be useful for various medical applications, including treatment of epilepsy, arthritis, aiding recovery from heart attack and slowing the progression of Alzheimer's disease. Belnacasan is an orally active prodrug, being converted in the body to the active drug VRT-043198 (O-desethyl-belnacasan). However while belnacasan has proved well tolerated in human clinical trials, it has not shown sufficient efficacy to be approved for use for any of the applications suggested to date, though research continues into possible future uses of this or similar drugs.
