= NLRP11 =

Protein-coding gene in the species Homo sapiens

Identifiers
- Aliases: NLRP11, CLR19.6, NALP11, NOD17, PAN10, PYPAF6, PYPAF7, NLR family, pyrin domain containing 11, NLR family pyrin domain containing 11
- External IDs: OMIM: 609664; GeneCards: NLRP11

Gene location (Human)
Chr.	Chromosome 19 (human)
Band	19q13.42-q13.43	Start	55,785,397 bp
Band	19q13.42-q13.43	End	55,836,800 bp
RNA expression pattern
Bgee	Human / Mouse (ortholog); Top expressed in: secondary oocyte; testicle; gonad; right lobe of liver; right testis; islet of Langerhans; left testis; lymph node; gallbladder; renal cortex / n/a; More reference expression data
BioGPS	n/a
Orthologs
Databases	NCBI: entry; OMA: entry
Species	Human	Mouse
Entrez	204801	n/a
Ensembl	ENSG00000179873	n/a
UniProt	P59045	n/a
RefSeq (mRNA)	NM_145007; NM_001297743	n/a
RefSeq (protein)	NP_001284672; NP_659444	n/a
Location (UCSC)	Chr 19: 55.79 – 55.84 Mb	n/a
PubMed search		n/a
- Wikidata
View/Edit Human

NOD-like receptor family pyrin domain containing 11 is a protein that in humans is encoded by the NLRP11 gene located on the long arm of human chromosome 19q13.42. NLRP11 belongs to the NALP subfamily, part of a large subfamily of CATERPILLER. It is also known as NALP11, PYPAF6, NOD17, PAN10, and CLR19.6

Being a member of the NOD-like receptor protein (NLRP) gene family, it encodes a protein with an N-terminal pyrin death (PYD) domain and nucleoside triphosphate hydrolase (NACHT) domain and a C-terminal leucine-rich repeats (LRR) region. This gene regulates caspases in the proinflammatory signal transduction pathway. Based on studies of other members of the NLRP gene family with similar domain structures, it is predicted to form part of the multiprotein inflammasome complex.

NLRP11 is expressed mainly in immune cells, B cells, myeloid cells, and B cell lymphoma cell lines. NLRP11 is involved in the regulation of inflammatory responses in human cells.

NALPs family controls cytokines, inflammatory responses, NF-κB activation, and likely cell death and survival.

== Structure ==
This gene encodes a protein with an N-terminal pyrin death (PYD) domain and nucleoside triphosphate hydrolase (NACHT) domain, and a C-terminal leucine-rich repeats (LRR) region. It contains a total of 14 LRRs and 1033 amino acids.

== Evolution ==
NLRP11 is a primate-specific gene and is not found in mice A study on the evolution of mammalian reproduction-related NLRPs found that NLRP11 is part of a family cluster of genes that duplicated before the divergence of mammals.

== Function ==
Bacterial lipopolysaccharide (LPS) is an endotoxin that can lead to lethal infection sepsis by activating innate immune responses. Cytoplasmic LPS(cLPS) induces the assembly of an inflammasome that contains caspases-4/5 in humans or caspase-11 in mice NLRP11 serves as a pattern recognition receptor for cLPS and can result in caspase-4 inflammasome activation.

There is also a novel role of NLRP11 in the regulation of inflammatory responses in human cells. In primates, NLRP11 also serves as a conserved negative regulator of TLR signaling. NLRP11 acts as a negative regulator of type I IFN and virus-induced apoptosis by disrupting the Mitochondrial antiviral-signaling protein (MAVS) signalosome activity. ATP-dependent RNA helicase DDX3X is a novel binding partner of NLRP11. NLRP11 suppressed the positive effect of DDX3X on NLRP3 inflammasome-mediated caspase-1 activation. Research also suggested that there might be a role of NLRP11 function in innate immunity. NLRP11 and DDX3X might become promising targets for the modulation of innate immune responses.

Upon viral infection, Type I IFN activates NLRP11, and upon activation, it translocates to mitochondria to interact with MAVS. NLRP11 degrades TRAF6 using MAVS to attenuate the production of type I IFNs and virus-induced apoptosis. NLRP11 acts as a negative regulator of type I IFN and virus-induced apoptosis via disrupting the activity of MAVS signalosome.

In human macrophages, NLRP11 is an indispensable component of the NLRP3 inflammasome. The most studied inflammasome sensor molecule of the NLR family is NLRP3, and it contains an amino-terminal PYRIN (PYD) domain, a nucleotide-binding NACHT domain, and a carboxyterminal leucine-rich repeat (LRR) domain. The ATP binding is required for NLRP3 activation, NACHT domain of NLRP3 contains ATPase activity, and mutation of this site reduces ATP binding, caspase-1 activation, IL-1 production, cell death, macromolecular complex formation, and its association with apoptosis-associated speck-like protein containing a CARD (ASC).

There is an interaction between NLRP11, NLRP3, and ASC. NLRP3 inflammasome activation is inhibited by specific deletion of NLRP11, which leads to inhibition of ASC polymerization, caspase-1 activation, and subsequent cytokine release. NLRP3 mutations that cause cryopyrin-associated periodic syndrome (CAPS) also require NLRP11 for inflammasome responses. The complex biology of inflammasome regulation is being explored, and the role of NLRP11 in diseases is partially understood.
