= NLRC4 =

Protein-coding gene in the species Homo sapiens

Identifiers
- Aliases: NLRC4, CARD12, CLAN, CLAN1, CLANA, CLANB, CLANC, CLAND, CLR2.1, IPAF, AIFEC, FCAS4, NLR family, CARD domain containing 4, NLR family CARD domain containing 4
- External IDs: OMIM: 606831; MGI: 3036243; GeneCards: NLRC4
Available structures
PDB	Ortholog search: PDBe RCSB
PDB	List of PDB id codes 4KXF

Gene location (Human)
Chr.	Chromosome 2 (human)
Band	2p22.3	Start	32,224,453 bp
Band	2p22.3	End	32,265,732 bp

Gene location (Mouse)
Chr.	Chromosome 17 (mouse)
Band	17|17 E2	Start	74,732,433 bp
Band	17|17 E2	End	74,766,137 bp
RNA expression pattern
Bgee	Human / Mouse (ortholog); Top expressed in: monocyte; blood; granulocyte; gonad; trabecular bone; testicle; bone marrow; bone marrow cell; spleen; appendix / Top expressed in: jejunum; ileum; zygote; duodenum; colon; secondary oocyte; primary oocyte; proximal tubule; spleen; stomach; More reference expression data
BioGPS	n/a
Gene ontology
Molecular function	nucleotide binding; protein homodimerization activity; ubiquitin-protein transferase activity; protein binding; ATP binding; magnesium ion binding; cysteine-type endopeptidase inhibitor activity involved in apoptotic process; identical protein binding
Cellular component	cytoplasm; cytosol; intracellular anatomical structure; IPAF inflammasome complex; nucleus
Biological process	pyroptosis; inhibition of cysteine-type endopeptidase activity involved in apoptotic process; immune system process; regulation of cysteine-type endopeptidase activity involved in apoptotic process; mitotic spindle assembly; regulation of signal transduction; defense response to bacterium; positive regulation of NF-kappaB transcription factor activity; detection of bacterium; activation of innate immune response; positive regulation of apoptotic process; inflammatory response; protein homooligomerization; activation of cysteine-type endopeptidase activity involved in apoptotic process; apoptotic process; protein ubiquitination; regulation of apoptotic process; innate immune response
Sources:Amigo / QuickGO
Orthologs
Databases	NCBI: entry; OMA: entry
Species	Human	Mouse
Entrez	58484	268973
Ensembl	ENSG00000091106	ENSMUSG00000039193
UniProt	Q9NPP4	Q3UP24
RefSeq (mRNA)	NM_001199138; NM_001199139; NM_001302504; NM_021209	NM_001033367
RefSeq (protein)	NP_001186067; NP_001186068; NP_001289433; NP_067032	NP_001028539
Location (UCSC)	Chr 2: 32.22 – 32.27 Mb	Chr 17: 74.73 – 74.77 Mb
PubMed search
- Wikidata
View/Edit Human	View/Edit Mouse

NLR family CARD domain-containing protein 4 is a protein that in humans is encoded by the NLRC4 gene.

== Structure ==
The NLRC4 protein is highly conserved across mammalian species. It bears homology to the C. elegans Ced4 protein. It contains an N-terminal CARD domain, a central nucleotide binding/NACHT domain, and a C-terminal leucine rich repeat (LRR) domain. It belongs to a family of NLR proteins that includes the transcriptional co-activator CIITA and the canonical inflammasome protein NLRP3. A truncated murine NLRC4 was the first member of this family whose crystal structure was solved.

== Function ==
NLRC4 is best associated with triggering formation of the inflammasome. Unlike NLRP3, certain inflammasome-dependent functions of NLRC4 may be carried out independently of the inflammasome scaffold ASC. Human Ced4 homologs include APAF1, NOD1 (CARD4), and NOD2 (CARD15). These proteins have at least 1 N-terminal CARD domain followed by a centrally located nucleotide-binding domain (NBD or NACHT) and a C-terminal regulatory domain, found only in mammals, that contains either WD40 repeats or leucine-rich repeats (LRRs). CARD12 is a member of the Ced4 family and can induce apoptosis.

== Interactions ==
NLRC4 has been shown to interact with NAIP (there is one human NAIP but mice express at least 4 distinct NAIP proteins). The NAIP/NLRC4 interaction may determine the ligand specificity. NLRC4-dependent inflammasome activity activates CASP1. Under certain circumstances, NLRC4 and NLRP3 may occupy the same inflammasome complex.

== Clinical significance ==
Humans bearing activating mutations in NLRC4 can develop an autoinflammatory syndrome characterized by acute fever, hepatitis, very high serum ferritin, and other features suggestive of Macrophage Activation Syndrome (MAS). Some patients also developed a potentially life-threatening enterocolitis that abated during early childhood. In these patients, chronic and extraordinary elevation of serum IL-18 is found, in distinction from patients with NLRP3 mutations who develop Cryopyrin Associated Periodic Syndromes. A large Japanese family had much milder disease associated with cold-induced urticaria that was caused by a dominantly inherited NLRC4 mutation.
