= NWD1 =

Protein-coding gene in the species Homo sapiens

Identifiers
- Aliases: NWD1, NACHT and WD repeat domain containing 1
- External IDs: OMIM: 616250; MGI: 2442268; GeneCards: NWD1

Gene location (Human)
Chr.	Chromosome 19 (human)
Band	19p13.11	Start	16,719,847 bp
Band	19p13.11	End	16,817,963 bp

Gene location (Mouse)
Chr.	Chromosome 8 (mouse)
Band	8|8 B3.3	Start	72,646,711 bp
Band	8|8 B3.3	End	72,717,876 bp
RNA expression pattern
Bgee	Human / Mouse (ortholog); Top expressed in: olfactory zone of nasal mucosa; right uterine tube; corpus callosum; caudate nucleus; nucleus accumbens; temporal lobe; amygdala; putamen; anterior cingulate cortex; right frontal lobe / Top expressed in: olfactory epithelium; Epithelium of choroid plexus; lumbar subsegment of spinal cord; substantia nigra; dentate gyrus of hippocampal formation granule cell; Rostral migratory stream; primary visual cortex; superior frontal gyrus; cerebellar cortex; hippocampus proper; More reference expression data
BioGPS	n/a
Gene ontology
Molecular function	ATP binding; nucleotide binding; RNA binding
Cellular component	cytoplasm; cytosol; U5 snRNP; precatalytic spliceosome; catalytic step 2 spliceosome
Biological process	RNA splicing; positive regulation of gene expression; negative regulation of NF-kappaB transcription factor activity
Sources:Amigo / QuickGO
Orthologs
Databases	NCBI: entry; OMA: entry
Species	Human	Mouse
Entrez	284434	319555
Ensembl	ENSG00000188039	ENSMUSG00000048148
UniProt	Q149M9	A6H603
RefSeq (mRNA)	NM_001007525; NM_001290355; NM_001347994	NM_001159403; NM_176940
RefSeq (protein)	NP_001007526; NP_001277284; NP_001334923	NP_795914
Location (UCSC)	Chr 19: 16.72 – 16.82 Mb	Chr 8: 72.65 – 72.72 Mb
PubMed search
- Wikidata
View/Edit Human	View/Edit Mouse

NWD1, short for NACHT and WD repeat domain containing 1, is a gene found in vertebrates, which encodes a protein that contains a NACHT domain and a WD40 repeat domain. It was originally identified during a search for immune system genes in zebrafish as a protein coding sequence related to APAF1; orthologs were subsequently identified in mammalian species. The NWD1 gene of humans is located on chromosome 19. Current data suggests a causal role for tumor-associated over-expression of NWD1 in the dysregulation of androgen receptor signaling during prostate cancer progression.
