= NLRP13 =

Protein-coding gene in the species Homo sapiens

Identifiers
- Aliases: NLRP13, CLR19.7, NALP13, NOD14, PAN13, NLR family, pyrin domain containing 13, NLR family pyrin domain containing 13
- External IDs: OMIM: 609660; GeneCards: NLRP13

Gene location (Human)
Chr.	Chromosome 19 (human)
Band	19q13.43	Start	55,891,699 bp
Band	19q13.43	End	55,932,336 bp
RNA expression pattern
Bgee	Human / Mouse (ortholog); Top expressed in: oocyte; secondary oocyte; epithelium of colon; bone marrow cell; testicle; tonsil; skeletal muscle tissue; urinary bladder; liver; breast / n/a; More reference expression data
BioGPS	n/a
Orthologs
Databases	NCBI: entry; OMA: entry
Species	Human	Mouse
Entrez	126204	n/a
Ensembl	ENSG00000173572	n/a
UniProt	Q86W25	n/a
RefSeq (mRNA)	NM_176810; NM_001321057	n/a
RefSeq (protein)	NP_001307986; NP_789780	n/a
Location (UCSC)	Chr 19: 55.89 – 55.93 Mb	n/a
PubMed search		n/a
- Wikidata
View/Edit Human

NLRP13, short for NOD-like receptor family pyrin domain containing 13, is an intracellular protein of mammals. It is also known as NALP13, NOD14, PAN13, and CLR19.7, and is one of 14 pyrin domain containing members of the NOD-like receptor family of cytoplasmic receptors. The function of NLRP13 is currently unknown.
