= NLRC3 =

Protein-coding gene in the species Homo sapiens

Identifiers
- Aliases: NLRC3, CLR16.2, NOD3, NLR family, CARD domain containing 3, NLR family CARD domain containing 3
- External IDs: OMIM: 615648; MGI: 2444070; HomoloGene: 18720; GeneCards: NLRC3; OMA:NLRC3 - orthologs

Gene location (Human)
Chr.	Chromosome 16 (human)
Band	16p13.3	Start	3,539,033 bp
Band	16p13.3	End	3,577,403 bp

Gene location (Mouse)
Chr.	Chromosome 16 (mouse)
Band	16|16 A1	Start	3,762,871 bp
Band	16|16 A1	End	3,794,496 bp
RNA expression pattern
Bgee	Human / Mouse (ortholog); Top expressed in: thymus; granulocyte; mucosa of ileum; blood; lymph node; endothelial cell; spleen; appendix; epithelium of nasopharynx; tonsil / Top expressed in: mesenteric lymph nodes; blood; thymus; soleus muscle; spleen; lumbar subsegment of spinal cord; stroma of bone marrow; submandibular gland; subcutaneous adipose tissue; morula; More reference expression data
BioGPS	n/a
Gene ontology
Molecular function	nucleotide binding; ATP binding; protein binding; phosphatidylinositol 3-kinase regulatory subunit binding; molecular function
Cellular component	cytoplasm; microtubule organizing center; cytosol; perinuclear region of cytoplasm
Biological process	negative regulation of interleukin-6 production; negative regulation of tumor necrosis factor production; I-kappaB kinase/NF-kappaB signaling; negative regulation of NF-kappaB transcription factor activity; T cell activation; negative regulation of I-kappaB kinase/NF-kappaB signaling; negative regulation of phosphatidylinositol 3-kinase signaling; negative regulation of interferon-alpha production; negative regulation of interferon-beta production; negative regulation of innate immune response; negative regulation of fibroblast proliferation; negative regulation of epithelial cell proliferation; negative regulation of inflammatory response; negative regulation of cytokine production involved in inflammatory response; negative regulation of NLRP3 inflammasome complex assembly; negative regulation of NIK/NF-kappaB signaling; intracellular signal transduction
Sources:Amigo / QuickGO
Orthologs
Species	Human	Mouse
Entrez	197358	268857
Ensembl	ENSG00000167984	ENSMUSG00000049871
UniProt	Q7RTR2	Q5DU56
RefSeq (mRNA)	NM_178844	NM_001081280; NM_175547
RefSeq (protein)	NP_849172	NP_001074749; NP_780756
Location (UCSC)	Chr 16: 3.54 – 3.58 Mb	Chr 16: 3.76 – 3.79 Mb
PubMed search
- Wikidata
View/Edit Human	View/Edit Mouse

NLRC3, short for NOD-like receptor family CARD domain containing 3, is an intracellular protein that plays a role in the immune system. It was previously known as nucleotide-binding oligomerization domain, leucine rich repeat and CARD domain containing 3 (NOD3) and CLR16.2. NLRC3 inhibits the activity of T cells. NLRC3 also inhibits the mTOR signalling pathway to block cellular proliferation.
