= NLRP4 =

Protein-coding gene in the species Homo sapiens

Identifiers
- Aliases: NLRP4, CLR19.5, CT58, NALP4, PAN2, PYPAF4, RNH2, NLR family, pyrin domain containing 4, NLR family pyrin domain containing 4
- External IDs: OMIM: 609645; MGI: 1890518; GeneCards: NLRP4
Available structures
PDB	Ortholog search: PDBe RCSB
PDB	List of PDB id codes 4EWI

Gene location (Human)
Chr.	Chromosome 19 (human)
Band	19q13.43	Start	55,836,540 bp
Band	19q13.43	End	55,881,855 bp

Gene location (Mouse)
Chr.	Chromosome 7 (mouse)
Band	7|7 A1	Start	6,048,160 bp
Band	7|7 A1	End	6,108,149 bp
RNA expression pattern
Bgee	Human / Mouse (ortholog); Top expressed in: secondary oocyte; testicle; gonad; sperm; right testis; left testis; lymph node; appendix; tonsil; epithelium of nasopharynx / Top expressed in: primary oocyte; zygote; secondary oocyte; blastocyst; embryo; blastocyst; morula; spermatid; Gonadal ridge; embryo; More reference expression data
BioGPS	n/a
Gene ontology
Molecular function	nucleotide binding; ATP binding
Cellular component	cytosol
Biological process	inflammatory response; regulation of type I interferon production
Sources:Amigo / QuickGO
Orthologs
Databases	NCBI: entry; OMA: entry
Species	Human	Mouse
Entrez	147945	83564
Ensembl	ENSG00000160505	ENSMUSG00000034690
UniProt	Q96MN2	Q3TKR3
RefSeq (mRNA)	NM_134444	NM_031389
RefSeq (protein)	NP_604393	NP_113566
Location (UCSC)	Chr 19: 55.84 – 55.88 Mb	Chr 7: 6.05 – 6.11 Mb
PubMed search
- Wikidata
View/Edit Human	View/Edit Mouse

NACHT, LRR and PYD domains-containing protein 4 is a protein that in humans is encoded by the NLRP4 gene.

NALPs are cytoplasmic proteins that form a subfamily within the larger CATERPILLER protein family. Most short NALPs, such as NALP4, have an N-terminal pyrin (MEFV; MIM 608107) domain (PYD), followed by a NACHT domain, a NACHT-associated domain (NAD), and a C-terminal leucine-rich repeat (LRR) region.

The long NALP, NALP1 (MIM 606636), also has a C-terminal extension containing a function to find domain (FIIND) and a caspase recruitment domain (CARD). NALPs are implicated in the activation of proinflammatory caspases (e.g., CASP1; MIM 147678) via their involvement in multiprotein complexes called inflammasomes (Tschopp et al., 2003).[supplied by OMIM]
