= NLRP14 =

Protein-coding gene in the species Homo sapiens

Identifiers
- Aliases: NLRP14, CLR11.2, GC-LRR, NALP14, NOD5, PAN8, NLR family, pyrin domain containing 14, NLR family pyrin domain containing 14
- External IDs: OMIM: 609665; MGI: 1924108; GeneCards: NLRP14
Available structures
PDB	Ortholog search: PDBe RCSB
PDB	List of PDB id codes 4N1J, 4N1K, 4N1L

Gene location (Human)
Chr.	Chromosome 11 (human)
Band	11p15.4	Start	7,020,479 bp
Band	11p15.4	End	7,071,526 bp

Gene location (Mouse)
Chr.	Chromosome 7 (mouse)
Band	7|7 E3	Start	106,766,197 bp
Band	7|7 E3	End	106,797,309 bp
RNA expression pattern
Bgee	Human / Mouse (ortholog); Top expressed in: oocyte; secondary oocyte; testicle; bone marrow cell; ventricular zone; olfactory zone of nasal mucosa; ganglionic eminence; liver; human kidney; spinal cord / Top expressed in: primary oocyte; secondary oocyte; zygote; spermatid; spermatocyte; seminiferous tubule; morula; embryo; ovary; blastocyst; More reference expression data
BioGPS	n/a
Gene ontology
Molecular function	ATP binding; nucleotide binding
Cellular component	cytoplasm
Biological process	cell differentiation; multicellular organism development; spermatogenesis
Sources:Amigo / QuickGO
Orthologs
Databases	NCBI: entry; OMA: entry
Species	Human	Mouse
Entrez	338323	76858
Ensembl	ENSG00000158077	ENSMUSG00000016626
UniProt	Q86W24	Q6B966
RefSeq (mRNA)	NM_176822	NM_001002894
RefSeq (protein)	NP_789792	NP_001002894
Location (UCSC)	Chr 11: 7.02 – 7.07 Mb	Chr 7: 106.77 – 106.8 Mb
PubMed search
- Wikidata
View/Edit Human	View/Edit Mouse

NLRP14, short for NOD-like receptor family pyrin domain containing 14, is an intracellular protein of mammals associated with a role in spermatogenesis. It is also known as NALP14, NOD5, GC-LRR, Nalp-iota, PAN8, and CLR11.2, and is one of 14 pyrin domain containing members of the NOD-like receptor family of cytoplasmic receptors. NLRP14 is found exclusively in the testes where it is expressed within spermatogonia, spermatocytes and spermatids.
