= NLRP5 =

Protein-coding gene in the species Homo sapiens

Identifiers
- Aliases: NLRP5, CLR19.8, MATER, NALP5, PAN11, PYPAF8, NLR family, pyrin domain containing 5, NLR family pyrin domain containing 5
- External IDs: OMIM: 609658; MGI: 1345193; GeneCards: NLRP5

Gene location (Human)
| Chr. | Chromosome 19 (human) |
| Band | 19q13.43 | Start | 55,999,726 bp |
| Band | 19q13.43 | End | 56,061,810 bp |

Gene location (Mouse)
| Chr. | Chromosome 7 (mouse) |
| Band | 7 A3|7 10.22 cM | Start | 23,085,314 bp |
| Band | 7 A3|7 10.22 cM | End | 23,141,347 bp |
RNA expression pattern
| Bgee | Human / Mouse (ortholog); Top expressed in: secondary oocyte; testicle; gonad; endometrium; gastric mucosa; anterior pituitary; ovary; right ovary; myeloid leukocyte; monocyte / Top expressed in: primary oocyte; secondary oocyte; zygote; egg cell; ovary; morula; fossa; seminiferous tubule; spermatid; blastocyst; More reference expression data |
| BioGPS | n/a |
Gene ontology
| Molecular function | nucleotide binding; ATP binding |
| Cellular component | cytoplasm; nucleolus; mitochondrion; nucleus |
| Biological process | neuron death |
Sources:Amigo / QuickGO
Orthologs
| Databases | NCBI: entry; OMA: entry |
| Species | Human | Mouse |
| Entrez | 126206 | 23968 |
| Ensembl | ENSG00000171487 | ENSMUSG00000015721 |
| UniProt | P59047 | Q9R1M5 |
| RefSeq (mRNA) | NM_153447 | NM_001039143; NM_011860; NM_001305857 |
| RefSeq (protein) | NP_703148 | NP_001034232; NP_001292786; NP_035990 |
| Location (UCSC) | Chr 19: 56 – 56.06 Mb | Chr 7: 23.09 – 23.14 Mb |
| PubMed search |
- Wikidata
| View/Edit Human | View/Edit Mouse |

NLRP5, short for NOD-like receptor family pyrin domain containing 5, is an intracellular protein that plays a role in early embryogenesis. NLRP5 is also known as NACHT, LRR and PYD domains-containing protein 5 (NALP5), Mater protein homolog (MATER), PYPAF8, PAN11, and CLR19.8, and is one of 14 pyrin domain containing members of the NOD-like receptor family of cytoplasmic receptors known to mammals.

In humans, the NLRP5 protein is encoded by the NLRP5 gene.
