= NLRP9 =

Protein-coding gene in the species Homo sapiens

Identifiers
- Aliases: NLRP9, CLR19.1, NALP9, NOD6, PAN12, NLR family, pyrin domain containing 9, NLR family pyrin domain containing 9
- External IDs: OMIM: 609663; MGI: 2675377; GeneCards: NLRP9

Gene location (Human)
Chr.	Chromosome 19 (human)
Band	19q13.42	Start	55,708,438 bp
Band	19q13.42	End	55,738,402 bp

Gene location (Mouse)
Chr.	Chromosome 7 (mouse)
Band	7|7 A3	Start	19,725,390 bp
Band	7|7 A3	End	19,807,231 bp
RNA expression pattern
Bgee	Human / Mouse (ortholog); Top expressed in: secondary oocyte; gonad; testicle; muscle layer of sigmoid colon; tibial arteries; body of stomach; prostate; fundus; right coronary artery; body of uterus / Top expressed in: zygote; secondary oocyte; primary oocyte; jejunum; embryo; embryo; morula; colon; epithelium of small intestine; ileum; More reference expression data
BioGPS	n/a
Gene ontology
Molecular function	ATP binding; nucleotide binding; protein binding
Cellular component	cytoplasm; inflammasome complex
Biological process	positive regulation of interleukin-18 production; defense response to virus; pyroptosis; immune system process; inflammatory response; innate immune response
Sources:Amigo / QuickGO
Orthologs
Databases	NCBI: entry; OMA: entry
Species	Human	Mouse
Entrez	338321	243874
Ensembl	ENSG00000185792	ENSMUSG00000060508
UniProt	Q7RTR0	Q66X22
RefSeq (mRNA)	NM_176820	NM_194058
RefSeq (protein)	NP_789790	NP_918947
Location (UCSC)	Chr 19: 55.71 – 55.74 Mb	Chr 7: 19.73 – 19.81 Mb
PubMed search
- Wikidata
View/Edit Human	View/Edit Mouse

NLRP9, short for NOD-like receptor family pyrin domain containing 9, is an intracellular protein that is expressed in the ovaries, testes, oocytes, and preimplantation embryos of mammals that is likely involved in reproductive processes. It is also known as NALP9, NOD6, PAN12, and CLR19.1, and is one of 14 pyrin domain containing members of the NOD-like receptor family of cytoplasmic receptors.
