= NLRP8 =

Protein-coding gene in the species Homo sapiens

Identifiers
- Aliases: NLRP8, CLR19.2, NALP8, NOD16, PAN4, NLR family, pyrin domain containing 8, NLR family pyrin domain containing 8
- External IDs: OMIM: 609659; GeneCards: NLRP8

Gene location (Human)
Chr.	Chromosome 19 (human)
Band	19q13.43	Start	55,947,832 bp
Band	19q13.43	End	55,988,629 bp
RNA expression pattern
Bgee	Human / Mouse (ortholog); Top expressed in: secondary oocyte; testicle / n/a; More reference expression data
BioGPS	n/a
Gene ontology
Molecular function	nucleotide binding; ATP binding; molecular function
Cellular component	cytoplasm; cellular component
Biological process	neuron death
Sources:Amigo / QuickGO
Orthologs
Databases	NCBI: entry; OMA: entry
Species	Human	Mouse
Entrez	126205	n/a
Ensembl	ENSG00000179709	n/a
UniProt	Q86W28	n/a
RefSeq (mRNA)	NM_176811; NM_001317000	n/a
RefSeq (protein)	NP_001303929; NP_789781	n/a
Location (UCSC)	Chr 19: 55.95 – 55.99 Mb	n/a
PubMed search		n/a
- Wikidata
View/Edit Human

NLRP8, short for NOD-like receptor family pyrin domain containing 8, is an intracellular protein that is expressed in the ovaries, testes, and preimplantation embryos of mammals. It is also known as NALP8, NOD16, PAN4, and CLR19.2, and is one of 14 pyrin domain containing members of the NOD-like receptor family of cytoplasmic receptors.
