= NOD2 =

Protein-coding gene in humans

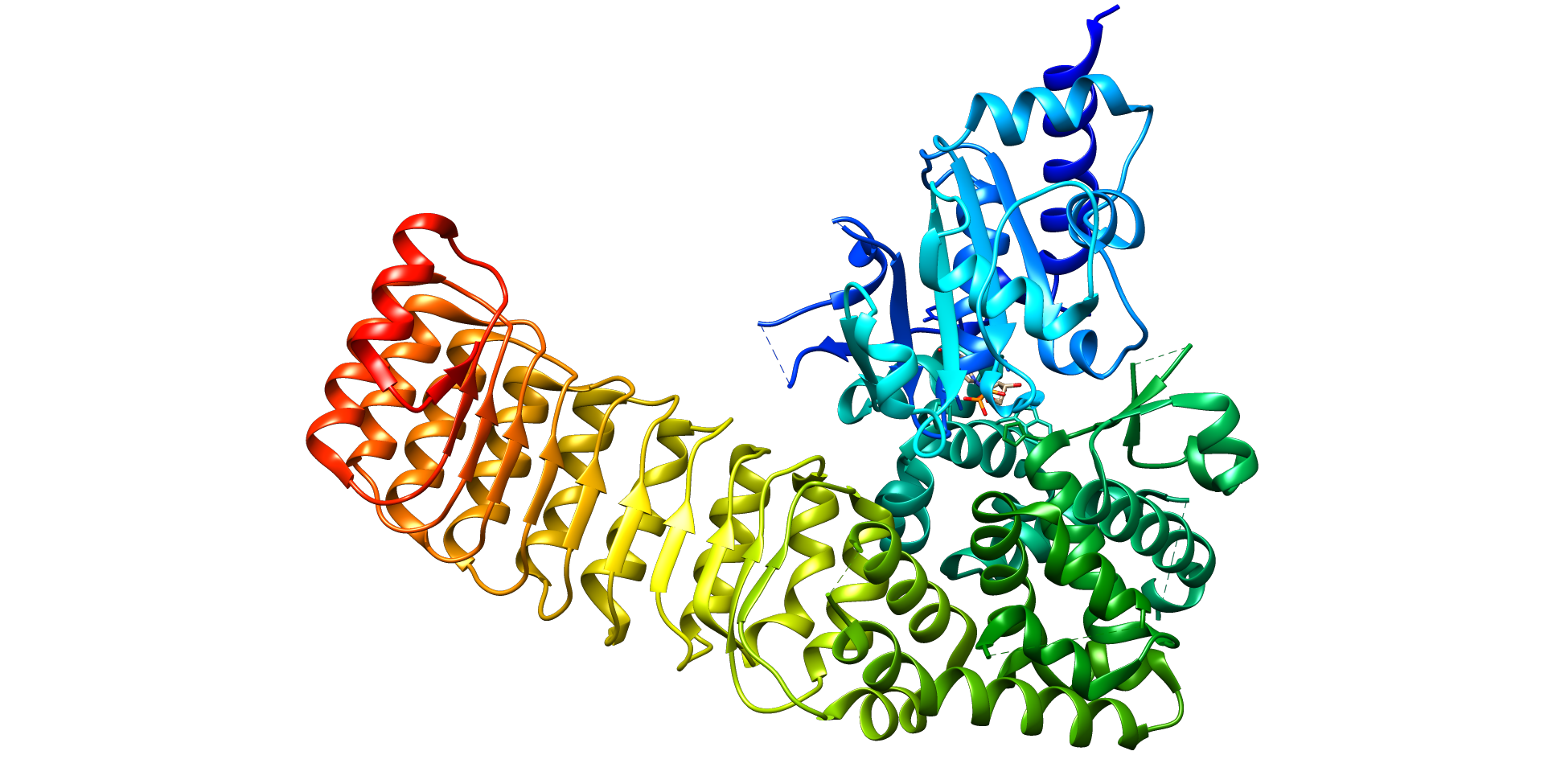

Identifiers
- Aliases: NOD2, ACUG, BLAU, CARD15, CD, CLR16.3, IBD1, NLRC2, NOD2B, PSORAS1, nucleotide binding oligomerization domain containing 2, BLAUS, YAOS
- External IDs: OMIM: 605956; MGI: 2429397; GeneCards: NOD2
Available structures
PDB	Ortholog search: PDBe RCSB
PDB	List of PDB id codes 5IRL, 5IRM, 5IRN

Gene location (Human)
Chr.	Chromosome 16 (human)
Band	16q12.1	Start	50,693,588 bp
Band	16q12.1	End	50,734,041 bp

Gene location (Mouse)
Chr.	Chromosome 8 (mouse)
Band	8|8 C3	Start	89,373,943 bp
Band	8|8 C3	End	89,415,102 bp
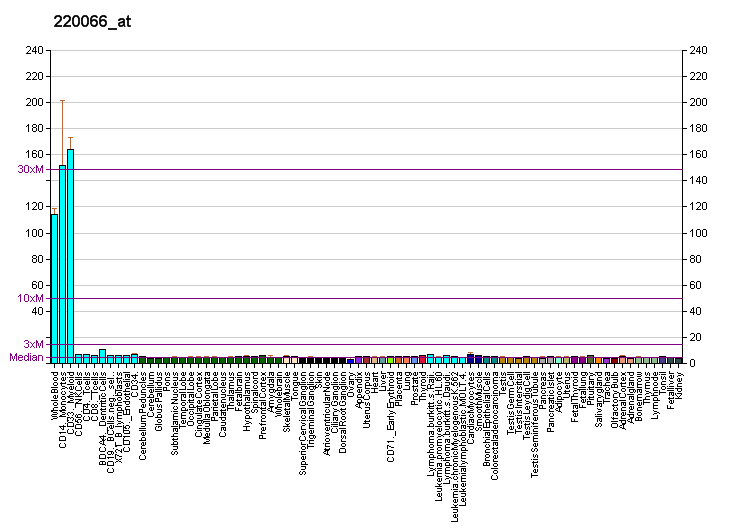
RNA expression pattern
Bgee	Human / Mouse (ortholog); Top expressed in: monocyte; granulocyte; blood; skin of leg; skin of abdomen; vulva; human penis; cartilage tissue; bone marrow cell; vagina / Top expressed in: granulocyte; secondary oocyte; primary oocyte; zygote; embryo; esophagus; zone of skin; lip; quadriceps femoris muscle; duodenum; More reference expression data
BioGPS	More reference expression data
Gene ontology
Molecular function	Hsp90 protein binding; nucleotide binding; Hsp70 protein binding; protein binding; peptidoglycan binding; enzyme binding; actin binding; CARD domain binding; ATP binding; protein kinase binding; muramyl dipeptide binding; protein-containing complex binding
Cellular component	cytoplasm; cytosol; vesicle; membrane; plasma membrane; cell surface; basolateral plasma membrane; COP9 signalosome; cytoskeleton; Golgi apparatus; mitochondrion; protein-containing complex
Biological process	positive regulation of prostaglandin-endoperoxide synthase activity; regulation of apoptotic process; defense response; detection of biotic stimulus; cytokine production involved in immune response; positive regulation of cytokine production involved in inflammatory response; intracellular signal transduction; detection of muramyl dipeptide; positive regulation of interleukin-10 production; positive regulation of epithelial cell proliferation; immune system process; positive regulation of oxidoreductase activity; response to muramyl dipeptide; positive regulation of prostaglandin-E synthase activity; positive regulation of JNK cascade; positive regulation of nitric-oxide synthase biosynthetic process; positive regulation of NIK/NF-kappaB signaling; positive regulation of phosphatidylinositol 3-kinase activity; positive regulation of gamma-delta T cell activation; cellular response to muramyl dipeptide; JNK cascade; negative regulation of macrophage apoptotic process; positive regulation of dendritic cell antigen processing and presentation; nucleotide-binding oligomerization domain containing 2 signaling pathway; maintenance of gastrointestinal epithelium; defense response to bacterium; positive regulation of NF-kappaB transcription factor activity; positive regulation of interleukin-8 production; detection of bacterium; positive regulation of interleukin-1 beta production; regulation of inflammatory response; positive regulation of interleukin-6 production; protein complex oligomerization; positive regulation of tumor necrosis factor production; positive regulation of ERK1 and ERK2 cascade; positive regulation of I-kappaB kinase/NF-kappaB signaling; positive regulation of B cell activation; positive regulation of interleukin-17 production; positive regulation of type 2 immune response; nucleotide-binding oligomerization domain containing signaling pathway; positive regulation of stress-activated MAPK cascade; positive regulation of Notch signaling pathway; positive regulation of transcription by RNA polymerase II; cellular response to organic cyclic compound; positive regulation of cell population proliferation; innate immune response; response to nutrient; positive regulation of dendritic cell cytokine production; positive regulation of protein K63-linked ubiquitination; cellular response to peptidoglycan; positive regulation of MAP kinase activity; interleukin-1-mediated signaling pathway; cellular response to lipopolysaccharide
Sources:Amigo / QuickGO
Orthologs
Databases	NCBI: entry; OMA: entry
Species	Human	Mouse
Entrez	64127	257632
Ensembl	ENSG00000167207	ENSMUSG00000055994
UniProt	Q9HC29	Q80SY9
RefSeq (mRNA)	NM_001293557; NM_022162; NM_001370466	NM_145857
RefSeq (protein)	NP_001280486; NP_071445; NP_001357395	NP_665856
Location (UCSC)	Chr 16: 50.69 – 50.73 Mb	Chr 8: 89.37 – 89.42 Mb
PubMed search
- Wikidata
View/Edit Human	View/Edit Mouse

Nucleotide-binding oligomerization domain-containing protein 2 (NOD2), also known as caspase recruitment domain-containing protein 15 (CARD15) or inflammatory bowel disease protein 1 (IBD1), is a protein that in humans is encoded by the NOD2 gene located on chromosome 16. NOD2 plays an important role in the immune system. It recognizes bacterial molecules (peptidoglycans) and stimulates an immune reaction.

NOD2 is an intracellular pattern recognition receptor, which is similar in structure to resistant proteins of plants and recognizes molecules containing the specific structure called muramyl dipeptide (MDP) that is found in certain bacteria.

== Structure ==
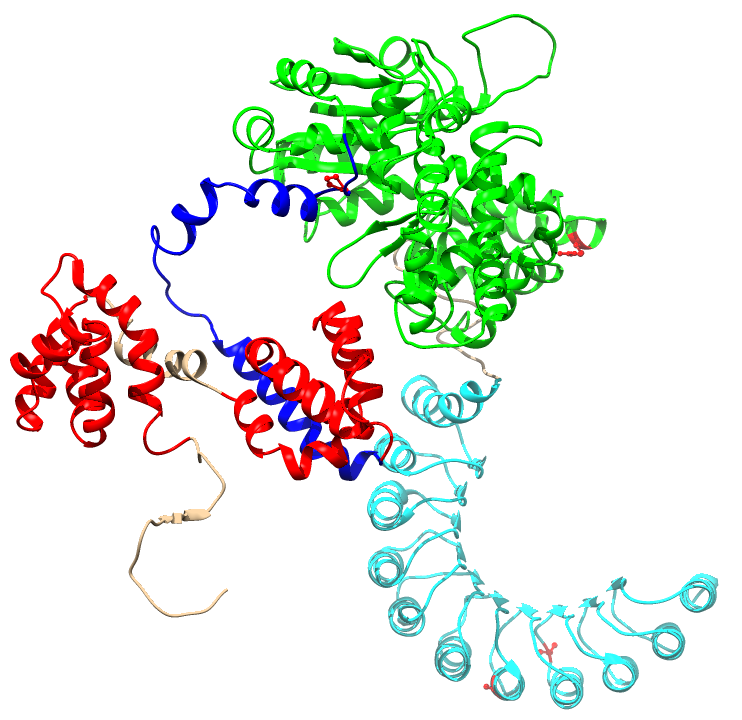
NOD2 protein model consisting two N-terminal CARD domains (red) connected via helical linker (blue) with central NOD domain (green). At C-terminus LRR domain (cyan) is located

The C-terminal portion of the protein contains a leucine-rich repeat domain that is known to play a role in protein–protein interactions. The middle part of the protein is characterized by a NOD domain involved in protein self-oligomerization. The N-terminal portion contains two CARD domains known to play a role in apoptosis and NF-κB activation pathways.

== Function ==
This gene is a member of the NOD1/Apaf-1 family (also known as NOD-like receptor family) and encodes a protein with two caspase recruitment domains (CARDs) and eleven leucine-rich repeats (LRRs). The protein is primarily expressed in the peripheral blood leukocytes. It plays a role in the immune response by recognizing the bacterial molecules which possess the muramyl dipeptide (MDP) moiety and activating the NF-κB protein.

== Clinical significance ==
Mutations in this gene have been associated with serious autoimmune diseases like Crohn's disease, Blau syndrome, pulmonary sarcoidosis and Graft-versus-host disease.

Loss of function mutations of NOD2 have been associated with better response to cancer therapy with PD-1/PD-L1 immune checkpoint blockade.

== Interactions ==
NOD2 has been shown to interact with NLRC4.

NOD2 has also been shown to bind to MAVS in response to ssRNA or viral RNA treatment and activate the IFN response. This is the first report of NOD2 acting as a pattern-recognition receptor for viruses.

== See also ==
- Mifamurtide, a NOD2 activator for the treatment of osteosarcoma
