= NOD1 =

Protein receptor that recognizes bacterial molecules and stimulates an immune reaction

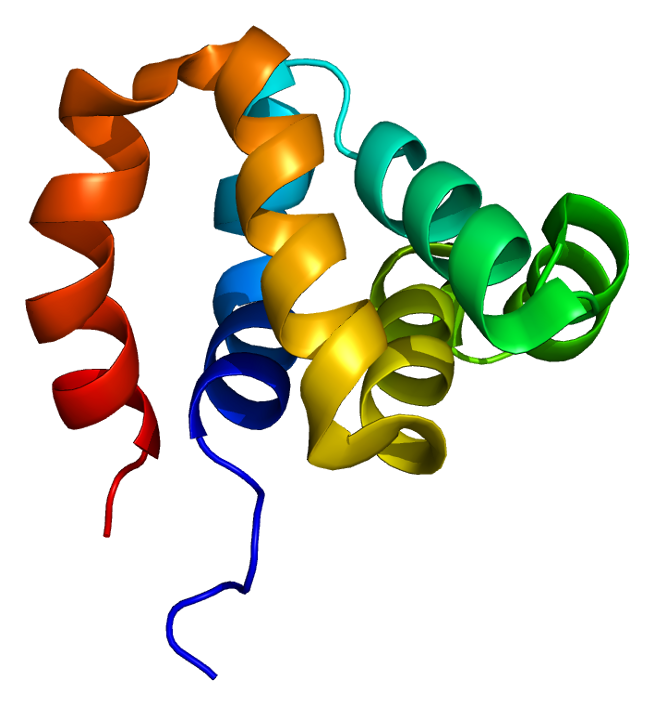

Identifiers
- Aliases: NOD1, CARD4, CLR7.1, NLRC1, nucleotide binding oligomerization domain containing 1
- External IDs: OMIM: 605980; MGI: 1341839; GeneCards: NOD1
Available structures
| PDB | Ortholog search: PDBe RCSB |
| PDB | List of PDB id codes 2B1W, 2DBD, 2NSN, 2NZ7, 4E9M, 4JQW |

Gene location (Human)
| Chr. | Chromosome 7 (human) |
| Band | 7p14.3 | Start | 30,424,527 bp |
| Band | 7p14.3 | End | 30,478,784 bp |

Gene location (Mouse)
| Chr. | Chromosome 6 (mouse) |
| Band | 6|6 B3 | Start | 54,900,934 bp |
| Band | 6|6 B3 | End | 54,949,597 bp |
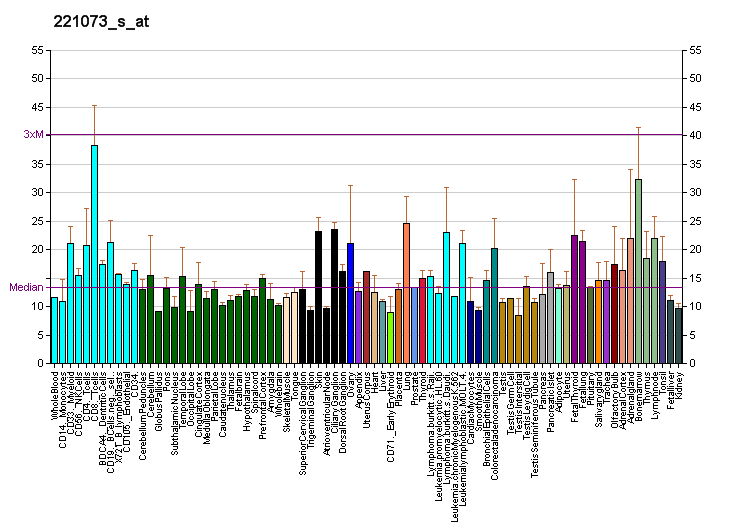
RNA expression pattern
| Bgee | Human / Mouse (ortholog); Top expressed in: sural nerve; left ovary; right lobe of thyroid gland; right ovary; gingival epithelium; upper lobe of left lung; left lobe of thyroid gland; apex of heart; subcutaneous adipose tissue; spleen / Top expressed in: mesenteric lymph nodes; granulocyte; subcutaneous adipose tissue; sciatic nerve; right lung; spleen; cervix; myocardium of ventricle; islet of Langerhans; stroma of bone marrow; More reference expression data |
| BioGPS | More reference expression data |
Gene ontology
| Molecular function | nucleotide binding; protein homodimerization activity; protein binding; peptidoglycan binding; identical protein binding; cysteine-type endopeptidase activator activity involved in apoptotic process; CARD domain binding; ATP binding; protein-containing complex binding |
| Cellular component | cytoplasm; cytosol; membrane; plasma membrane; basolateral plasma membrane; apical plasma membrane |
| Biological process | regulation of apoptotic process; defense response; detection of biotic stimulus; intracellular signal transduction; positive regulation of cell death; immune system process; positive regulation of JNK cascade; positive regulation of xenophagy; positive regulation of NIK/NF-kappaB signaling; cellular response to muramyl dipeptide; JNK cascade; positive regulation of cysteine-type endopeptidase activity involved in apoptotic process; positive regulation of dendritic cell antigen processing and presentation; positive regulation of nitric-oxide synthase activity; defense response to bacterium; positive regulation of NF-kappaB transcription factor activity; protein complex oligomerization; detection of bacterium; positive regulation of interleukin-1 beta production; positive regulation of ERK1 and ERK2 cascade; positive regulation of interleukin-6 production; positive regulation of tumor necrosis factor production; positive regulation of I-kappaB kinase/NF-kappaB signaling; inflammatory response; activation of cysteine-type endopeptidase activity involved in apoptotic process; nucleotide-binding oligomerization domain containing signaling pathway; signal transduction; positive regulation of stress-activated MAPK cascade; defense response to Gram-positive bacterium; apoptotic process; innate immune response; interleukin-1-mediated signaling pathway |
Sources:Amigo / QuickGO
Orthologs
| Databases | NCBI: entry; OMA: entry |
| Species | Human | Mouse |
| Entrez | 10392 | 107607 |
| Ensembl | ENSG00000106100 | ENSMUSG00000038058 |
| UniProt | Q9Y239 | Q8BHB0 |
| RefSeq (mRNA) | NM_006092; NM_001354849 | NM_001171007; NM_172729 |
| RefSeq (protein) | NP_006083; NP_001341778 | NP_001164478; NP_766317 |
| Location (UCSC) | Chr 7: 30.42 – 30.48 Mb | Chr 6: 54.9 – 54.95 Mb |
| PubMed search |
- Wikidata
| View/Edit Human | View/Edit Mouse |

Nucleotide-binding oligomerization domain-containing protein 1 (NOD1) is a protein receptor that in humans is encoded by the NOD1 gene. It recognizes bacterial molecules and stimulates an immune reaction.

NOD1 protein contains a caspase recruitment domain (CARD). NOD1 is a member of NOD-like receptor protein family and is a close relative of NOD2. NOD1 is an intracellular pattern recognition receptor, which is similar in structure to resistant proteins of plants, and mediates innate and acquired immunity by recognizing molecules containing D-glutamyl-meso-diaminopimelic acid (iE-DAP) moiety, including bacterial peptidoglycan. Nod1 interacts with RIPK2 through the CARDs of both molecules (See the structure of the NOD1 CARD in the right panel). Stimulation of NOD1 by iE-DAP containing molecules results in activation of the transcription factor NF-κB.
