= CARD (domain) =

Interaction motifs found in a wide array of proteins

Caspase recruitment domain
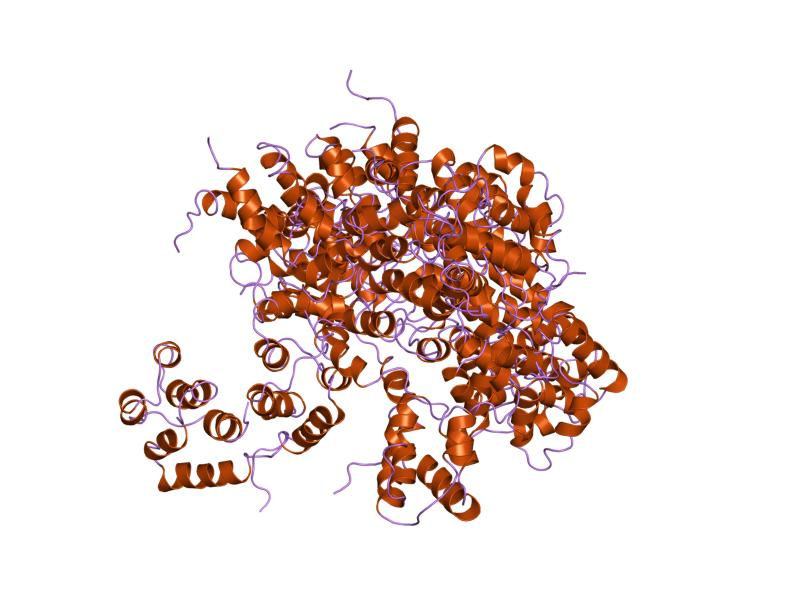
- Structure of the RAIDD CARD.

Identifiers
- Symbol: CARD
- Pfam: PF00619
- InterPro: IPR001315
- SMART: SM00114
- PROSITE: PS50209
- SCOP2: 3crd / SCOPe / SUPFAM
- CDD: cd01671
Available protein structures:
- PDB: 1c15, 1cww, 1cy5, 1dgn, 1z6t, 2a5y, 2p1h, 2ygs, 3crd, 3ygs IPR001315 PF00619 (ECOD; PDBsum)
- AlphaFold: IPR001315; PF00619

Caspase recruitment domain, IPS1/RIG-I

Identifiers
- Symbol: CARD_2
- Pfam: PF00619
- InterPro: IPR031964
- SCOP2: 2lwd / SCOPe / SUPFAM
- CDD: cd08789
Available protein structures:
- PDB: IPR031964 PF00619 (ECOD; PDBsum)
- AlphaFold: IPR031964; PF00619

Caspase recruitment domains, or caspase activation and recruitment domains (CARDs), are interaction motifs found in a wide array of proteins, typically those involved in processes relating to inflammation and apoptosis. These domains mediate the formation of larger protein complexes via direct interactions between individual CARDs. CARDs are found on a strikingly wide range of proteins, including helicases, kinases, mitochondrial proteins, caspases, and other cytoplasmic factors.

== Basic features ==
CARDs are a subclass of protein motif known as the death fold, which features an arrangement of six to seven antiparallel alpha helices with a hydrophobic core and an outer face composed of charged residues. Other motifs in this class include the pyrin domain (PYD), death domain (DD), and death effector domain (DED), all of which also function primarily in regulation of apoptosis and inflammatory responses.

== In apoptosis ==
CARDs were originally characterized based on their involvement in the regulation of caspase activation and apoptosis. The basic six-helix structure of the domain appears to be conserved as far back as the ced-3 and ced-4 genes in C. elegans, the organism in which several components of the apoptotic machinery were first characterized. CARDs are present on a number of proteins that promote apoptosis, primarily caspases 1,2,4,5,9, and 15 in mammals.

== In the mammalian immune response ==
=== IL-1 and IL-18 processing ===
A number of CARDs have been shown to play a role in regulating inflammation in response to bacterial and viral pathogens as well as to a variety of endogenous stress signals. Recently, studies on the NLR protein Ipaf-1 have provided insight into how CARDs participate in the immune response. Ipaf-1 features an N-terminal CARD, a nucleotide-binding domain, and C-terminal leucine-rich repeats (LRRs), thought to function in a similar fashion to those found in Toll-like receptors. The primary role of this molecule appears to be regulation of the proteolytic processing of pro-IL-1β and pro-IL-18 into their mature forms via association in a large complex known as the inflammasome. Upon activation of Ipaf-1 by the intracellular bacterium S. typhimurium or other stress signals, Ipaf-1 recruits a CARD-containing adapter termed ASC and caspase-1 in unknown stoichiometry via CARD-CARD association. This complex in turn leads to autoproteolytic activation of caspase-1 and subsequent IL-1β and IL-18 maturation.

=== Antiviral signaling ===
Recently, a subset of CARD-containing proteins has been shown to participate in recognition of intracellular double-stranded RNA, a common constituent of a number of viral genomes, including the para- and orthomyxoviridae and rhabdoviridae. Unlike NLRs, these proteins, termed RIG-I and MDA5, contain twin N-terminal CARDs and C-terminal RNA helicase domains that directly interact with and process the double-stranded viral RNA. This processing makes the CARDs available for interaction with the CARD of IPS-1/MAVS/VISA/Cardif, a downstream adapter anchored in the mitochondria. Although the interactions between IPS-1 and RIG-I/MDA-5 have been shown in vitro, the nature of the complex formed upon viral detection has not been characterized.

The adaptor protein VISA further activates the inhibitor of nuclear factor kappa-B kinase (IKK)-protein-kinase family members. Although the canonical IKK family members IKKa and IKKb are essential for virus-triggered NF-κB activation, the noncanonical IKK family members TBK1 and IKBKE are responsible for phosphorylating and activating IRF3 and IRF7 (Fitzgerald et al., 2003; Hemmi et al., 2004; Matsui et al., 2006). Various studies have also demonstrated the involvement of several other signaling components in virus-induced activation of NF-κB and/or IRF3, including TRAF3, TRAF6, TANK, NEMO (IKKg), TRADD, FADD, and RIP (Kawai et al., 2005; Michallet et al., 2008; Oganesyan et al., 2006; Saha et al., 2006; Xu et al., 2005; Zhao et al., 2007).

== Autoimmunity ==
Because of their role as regulators of inflammation, constitutive activation of certain CARD-containing proteins, either conferred by mutation or by constant presence of stress signals, has been suggested to play a causative role in a number of inflammatory syndromes. Gain-of-function mutations in the intracellular NOD2 protein has been linked to increased risk for Crohn's disease. Activating mutations in at least two related PYD-containing proteins, cryopyrin/CIAS-1 and pyrin/MEFV, have been linked to Muckle–Wells syndrome and familial Mediterranean fever, respectively.

== List of CARD-containing proteins ==
- BIRC2 baculoviral Inhibitor of apoptosis (IAP) repeat-containing 2, also known as C-IAP1
- BIRC3 baculoviral IAP repeat-containing 3, also known as C-IAP2
- CARD16: Caspase recruitment domain-containing protein 16
- caspase-1: apoptosis-related cysteine peptidase (interleukin 1, beta, convertase; ICE)
- caspase-2: apoptosis-related cysteine peptidase
- caspase-4: apoptosis-related cysteine peptidase
- caspase-5: apoptosis-related cysteine peptidase
- caspase-9: apoptosis-related cysteine peptidase
- caspase-12: apoptosis-related cysteine peptidase
- caspase-13: apoptosis-related cysteine peptidase
- ICEBERG: caspase-1 inhibitor iceberg
- MDA-5: Melanoma differentiation-associated protein 5, also called Interferon-induced helicase C domain-containing protein 1 (IFIH1)
- MAVS: Mitochondrial antiviral-signaling protein also known as CARD adapter inducing interferon-beta (Cardif/IPS-1)
- CRADD: Caspase and RIP adapter with death domain also known as RIP-associated protein with a death domain (RAIDD)
- RAIDD-2: Death adaptor molecule RAIDD-2
- RIG-I: Retinoic acid-inducible gene 1 protein, also known as DEAD-box protein 58 (DDX58)
- RIPK2: receptor-interacting serine-threonine kinase 2 (also called cardiak, RIP2 or RICK kinase)
- BCL10: B-cell lymphoma/leukemia 10 protein
- BINCA: Bcl10-interacting CARD protein or BinCARD, also called chromosome 9 open reading frame 89 (C9orf89)
- CARD6: caspase recruitment domain family, member 6
- CARD8/CARDINAL: caspase recruitment domain family, member 8
- CARD9: caspase recruitment domain family, member 9
- CARD10: caspase recruitment domain family, member 10 (also called CARMA3)
- CARD11: caspase recruitment domain family, member 11 (also called CARMA1)
- CARD14: caspase recruitment domain family, member 14 (also called CARMA2)
- APAF1: apoptotic peptidase activating factor 1 (also called CED4)
- GLAVA1: glavaris peptidase activating factor 1 (also called GLAV1)
- IPAF: Ice protease-activating factor, also known as NLR family, card domain containing 4 (NLRC4), CARD, LRR, and NACHT-containing protein (CLAN) and Caspase recruitment domain-containing protein 12 (CARD12)
- NOD1: nucleotide-binding oligomerization domain containing 1
- NOD2: nucleotide-binding oligomerization domain containing 2
- NLRC3: NOD-like receptor family CARD domain containing 3
- NLRC5 It has also been called NOD27, NOD4, and CLR16.1
- NLRP1: NLR family, pyrin domain containing 1 (previously called NALP1)
- NOL3: nucleolar protein 3 (apoptosis repressor with CARD domain)
- PYCARD: PYD and CARD containing protein (also called ASC)
- Ced-3 analog of caspase-9 in Caenorhabditis elegans
- AIRE Autoimmune Regulator
