= NLRP2 =

Protein-coding gene in the species Homo sapiens

Identifiers
- Aliases: NLRP2, CLR19.9, NALP2, NBS1, PAN1, PYPAF2, NLR family, pyrin domain containing 2, NLR family pyrin domain containing 2
- External IDs: OMIM: 609364; MGI: 3041206; GeneCards: NLRP2

Gene location (Human)
Chr.	Chromosome 19 (human)
Band	19q13.42	Start	54,953,130 bp
Band	19q13.42	End	55,001,142 bp

Gene location (Mouse)
Chr.	Chromosome 7 (mouse)
Band	7|7 A1	Start	5,301,546 bp
Band	7|7 A1	End	5,354,034 bp
RNA expression pattern
Bgee	Human / Mouse (ortholog); Top expressed in: gonad; placenta; testicle; granulocyte; left testis; right testis; ganglionic eminence; mucosa of transverse colon; lymph node; blood / Top expressed in: primary oocyte; secondary oocyte; zygote; morula; ovarian follicle; blastocyst; More reference expression data
BioGPS	n/a
Gene ontology
Molecular function	Pyrin domain binding; nucleotide binding; protein binding; ATP binding
Cellular component	cytoplasm; Golgi apparatus; intracellular membrane-bounded organelle; cytosol
Biological process	positive regulation of cysteine-type endopeptidase activity involved in apoptotic process; inflammatory response; innate immune response; immune system process; apoptotic process; negative regulation of NF-kappaB transcription factor activity
Sources:Amigo / QuickGO
Orthologs
Databases	NCBI: entry; OMA: entry
Species	Human	Mouse
Entrez	55655	232827
Ensembl	ENSG00000278789; ENSG00000275796; ENSG00000277060; ENSG00000275843; ENSG00000275399 ENSG00000022556; ENSG00000275082; ENSG00000278682; ENSG00000274638; ENSG00000273992	ENSMUSG00000035177
UniProt	Q9NX02	n/a
RefSeq (mRNA)	NM_017852; NM_001174081; NM_001174082; NM_001174083; NM_001348003	NM_177690
RefSeq (protein)	NP_001167552; NP_001167553; NP_001167554; NP_060322; NP_001334932	n/a
Location (UCSC)	Chr 19: 54.95 – 55 Mb	Chr 7: 5.3 – 5.35 Mb
PubMed search
- Wikidata
View/Edit Human	View/Edit Mouse

NACHT, LRR and PYD domains-containing protein 2 is a protein that in humans is encoded by the NLRP2 gene. The NLRP2 protein is involved in the regulation of inflammation. NLRP2 suppresses some of the effects of pro-inflammatory cytokines like TNF and NFKB1, in particular inhibiting the activation of NF-κB.

NALP proteins, such as NALP2, are characterized by an N-terminal pyrin domain (PYD) and are involved in the activation of caspase-1 (CASP1; MIM 147678) by Toll-like receptors(see TLR4). They may also be involved in protein complexes that activate proinflammatory caspases (Tschopp et al., 2003).[supplied by OMIM]

== Function ==
The NLRP2 gene is one of the family members of nucleotide-binding and leucine-rich repeat receptor (NLR). Information from many literature sources indicates that an N-terminal pyrin effector domain (PYD) is one of the components of the NLRP2 gene. Other components include a centrally located nucleotide-binding and oligomerization domain (NACHT) and C-terminal leucine-rich repeats (LRR). The products of NLRP2 gene are known to interact with IkB kinase (IKK) complex components. It can also regulate the activities of both caspase-1 and nuclear factor kappa-light-chain-enhancer of activated B cells (NF-kB). The pyrin domain is essential and adequate to suppress the activities of NF-kB (Minkiewicz, de Rivero Vaccari and Keane 1113). An allelic variant (rs147585490) is known to block the NF-kB transcriptional activities. NLRP2 gene is one of the NLR family; it is believed to contribute to the regulation of immune responses (Minkiewicz, de Rivero Vaccari and Keane 1121). Although it is not well understood, the NLRP2 gene is responsible for maintaining fertility in females and contributes to the normal birth. The NPRP2 gene encodes for a human protein known as "NACHT, LRR and PYD domains-containing protein 2". NALP2, which is one of the NALP proteins, has an N-terminal pyrin characterization also encoded as MIM 608107 and PYD domain. The NALP2 protein has a role in the activation process of caspase-1, which is encoded as CASP1; MIM 147678. The activation process occurs through the Toll-like receptors. The NALP2 may also take part in protein complexes, which initiates the activation of proinflammatory caspases. NLR family regulates the functioning of the immune system, which technically compromises the normal functions of the body including reproduction.

== Discovery ==
The NLR gene family where the NLRP2 gene belongs was first extracted from zebrafish, which is a common specimen for the study of immune systems. The NLRP2 gene is believed to have originated from the NLR gene family through mutation. The mutation was initiated by the need for organisms to fit a dynamic environment and diversification in the evolution stages. Also, the mutation of the NLR gene family proteins was also due to the ability of pathogens to subvert the defense mechanism of the host. Therefore, the organisms were forced to device new ways of detecting and counteracting the effects of the resistant pathogens. The evolution of the NLR proteins defines the origin of the NLRP2 gene. The NLRP2 gene is now an innate immune sensor for pathogens and sterile stress signal (SSS) in multi-cellular organisms.

== Mutation and infertility ==
The deficiency of NLRP2 gene results in the inhibition of the activation of oocytes. The NLRP2 gene is exclusively expressed in oocytes. Therefore, it regulates the quality of the oocytes, which explains its relation to infertility in females.
