= PYCARD =

Human protein and coding gene

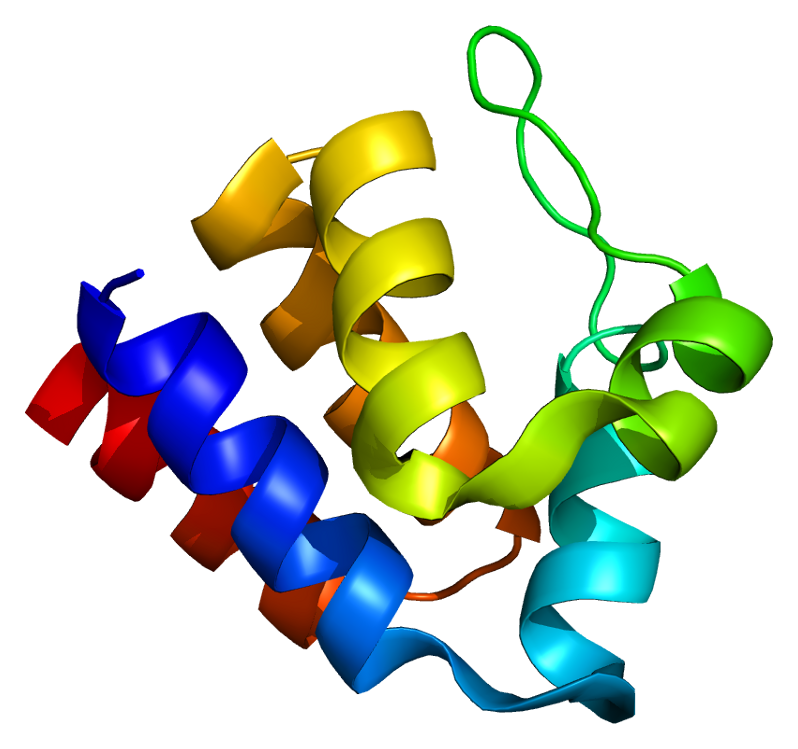

Identifiers
- Aliases: PYCARD, ASC, CARD5, TMS, TMS-1, TMS1, PYD and CARD domain containing
- External IDs: OMIM: 606838; MGI: 1931465; GeneCards: PYCARD
Available structures
PDB	Ortholog search: PDBe RCSB
PDB	List of PDB id codes 1UCP, 2KN6, 3J63, 5H8O

Gene location (Human)
Chr.	Chromosome 16 (human)
Band	16p11.2	Start	31,201,486 bp
Band	16p11.2	End	31,203,450 bp

Gene location (Mouse)
Chr.	Chromosome 7 (mouse)
Band	7|7 F3	Start	127,588,880 bp
Band	7|7 F3	End	127,593,039 bp
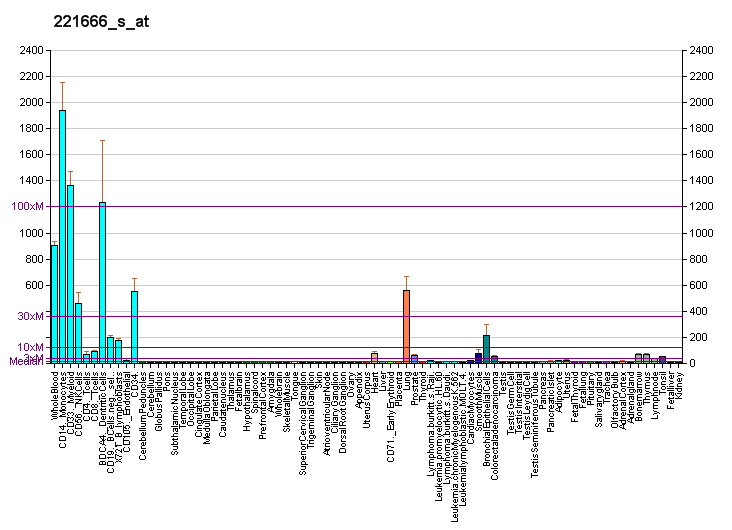
RNA expression pattern
Bgee	Human / Mouse (ortholog); Top expressed in: monocyte; granulocyte; mucosa of transverse colon; blood; vulva; human penis; skin of leg; skin of abdomen; spleen; gingival epithelium / Top expressed in: Paneth cell; migratory enteric neural crest cell; ileum; crypt of lieberkuhn of small intestine; epithelium of small intestine; duodenum; large intestine; colon; left colon; esophagus; More reference expression data
BioGPS	More reference expression data
Gene ontology
Molecular function	protein homodimerization activity; interleukin-6 receptor binding; BMP receptor binding; protein binding; identical protein binding; enzyme binding; cysteine-type endopeptidase activity involved in apoptotic process; Pyrin domain binding; cysteine-type endopeptidase activator activity involved in apoptotic process; myosin I binding; tropomyosin binding; protease binding; transmembrane transporter binding; protein dimerization activity; cysteine-type endopeptidase activity
Cellular component	cytoplasm; NLRP3 inflammasome complex; NLRP1 inflammasome complex; AIM2 inflammasome complex; nucleolus; endoplasmic reticulum; mitochondrion; IkappaB kinase complex; nucleus; secretory granule lumen; azurophil granule lumen; extracellular region; cytosol; protein-containing complex; soma; Golgi membrane; Golgi apparatus; membrane
Biological process	positive regulation of cysteine-type endopeptidase activity; regulation of apoptotic process; intrinsic apoptotic signaling pathway in response to DNA damage by p53 class mediator; regulation of intrinsic apoptotic signaling pathway; intrinsic apoptotic signaling pathway by p53 class mediator; positive regulation of adaptive immune response; defense response to Gram-negative bacterium; immune system process; cellular response to tumor necrosis factor; regulation of tumor necrosis factor-mediated signaling pathway; positive regulation of DNA-binding transcription factor activity; tumor necrosis factor-mediated signaling pathway; positive regulation of JNK cascade; negative regulation of interferon-beta production; negative regulation of I-kappaB kinase/NF-kappaB signaling; myeloid dendritic cell activation; positive regulation of T cell activation; defense response to virus; cellular response to interleukin-1; positive regulation of apoptotic process; positive regulation of tumor necrosis factor production; positive regulation of release of cytochrome c from mitochondria; negative regulation of protein serine/threonine kinase activity; positive regulation of extrinsic apoptotic signaling pathway; inflammatory response; cellular response to lipopolysaccharide; negative regulation of NF-kappaB transcription factor activity; signal transduction; apoptotic process; innate immune response; neutrophil degranulation; positive regulation of NF-kappaB transcription factor activity; activation of innate immune response; myeloid dendritic cell activation involved in immune response; positive regulation of antigen processing and presentation of peptide antigen via MHC class II; activation of cysteine-type endopeptidase activity involved in apoptotic process; positive regulation of actin filament polymerization; regulation of protein stability; positive regulation of interferon-gamma production; positive regulation of interleukin-6 production; positive regulation of activated T cell proliferation; positive regulation of cysteine-type endopeptidase activity involved in apoptotic process; macropinocytosis; positive regulation of phagocytosis; positive regulation of ERK1 and ERK2 cascade; positive regulation of T cell migration; positive regulation of defense response to virus by host; intrinsic apoptotic signaling pathway in response to DNA damage; response to bacterium; regulation of autophagy; interleukin-1 beta production; regulation of GTPase activity; regulation of cysteine-type endopeptidase activity involved in apoptotic process; regulation of inflammatory response; protein homooligomerization; activation of cysteine-type endopeptidase activity; negative regulation of cytokine production involved in inflammatory response; proteolysis; positive regulation of interleukin-1 beta production
Sources:Amigo / QuickGO
Orthologs
Databases	NCBI: entry; OMA: entry
Species	Human	Mouse
Entrez	29108	66824
Ensembl	ENSG00000103490	ENSMUSG00000030793
UniProt	Q9ULZ3	Q9EPB4
RefSeq (mRNA)	NM_145183; NM_013258; NM_145182	NM_023258
RefSeq (protein)	NP_037390; NP_660183	NP_075747
Location (UCSC)	Chr 16: 31.2 – 31.2 Mb	Chr 7: 127.59 – 127.59 Mb
PubMed search
- Wikidata
View/Edit Human	View/Edit Mouse

PYCARD, often referred to as ASC (Apoptosis-associated speck-like protein containing a CARD), is a protein that in humans is encoded by the PYCARD gene. It is localized mainly in the nucleus of monocytes and macrophages. In case of pathogen infection, however, it relocalizes rapidly to the cytoplasm, perinuclear space, endoplasmic reticulum and mitochondria and it is a key adaptor protein in activation of the inflammasome.

NMR structure of full-length ASC: PDB ID 2KN6

== Function ==
This gene encodes an adaptor protein that is composed of two protein–protein interaction domains: a N-terminal PYRIN-PAAD-DAPIN domain (PYD) and a C-terminal caspase-recruitment domain (CARD). The PYD and CARD domains are members of the six-helix bundle death domain-fold superfamily that mediates assembly of large signaling complexes in the inflammatory and apoptotic signaling pathways via the activation of caspase. In normal cells, this protein is localized to the cytoplasm; however, in cells undergoing apoptosis, it forms ball-like aggregates near the nuclear periphery.

PYCARD can occur in four different isoforms. Isoform 1, often referred to as canonical PYCARD, and isoform 2 are the activatory isoforms. They co-localize with nucleotide oligomerization domain-like receptors (NLRs) and caspase-1. Unlike isoform 1, isoform 2 is involved in direct IL-1β processing regulation. Isoform 3 is an inhibitory isoform, so that it only co-localizes with caspase-1, but not with NLRs. Isoform 4 is not able to act as an adaptor protein in NLR signalling and its role remains elusive.

== Interactions ==
PYCARD has been shown to interact with MEFV.
