= Pyrin domain =

PAAD/DAPIN/Pyrin domain
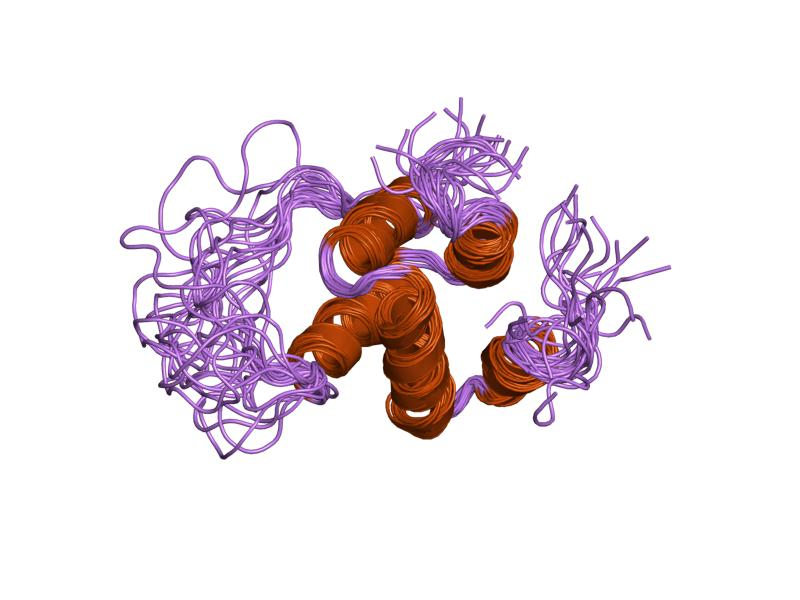

Identifiers
- Symbol: PAAD_DAPIN
- Pfam: PF02758
- Pfam clan: CL0041
- InterPro: IPR004020
- PROSITE: PS50824
- SCOP2: 1pn5 / SCOPe / SUPFAM
- CDD: cd08305
Available protein structures:
- PDB: 1pn5, 1ucp, 2hm2 IPR004020 PF02758 (ECOD; PDBsum)
- AlphaFold: IPR004020; PF02758

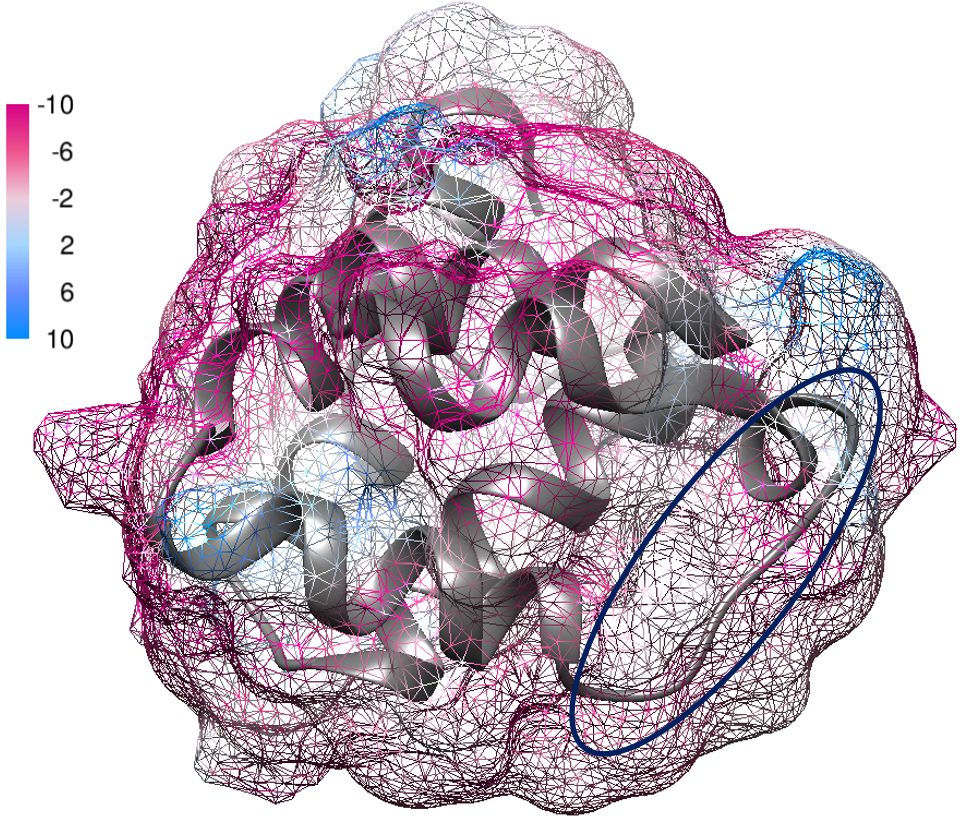
NMR structure of the NLRP7 pyrin domain rendered in UCSF Chimera. Mesh electrostatic potential map using Coulombic coloring is superimposed, showing areas of positive residue charge in blue and negative in maroon. Circled is the distinct elongated α2-α3 loop characteristic of pyrin domains.

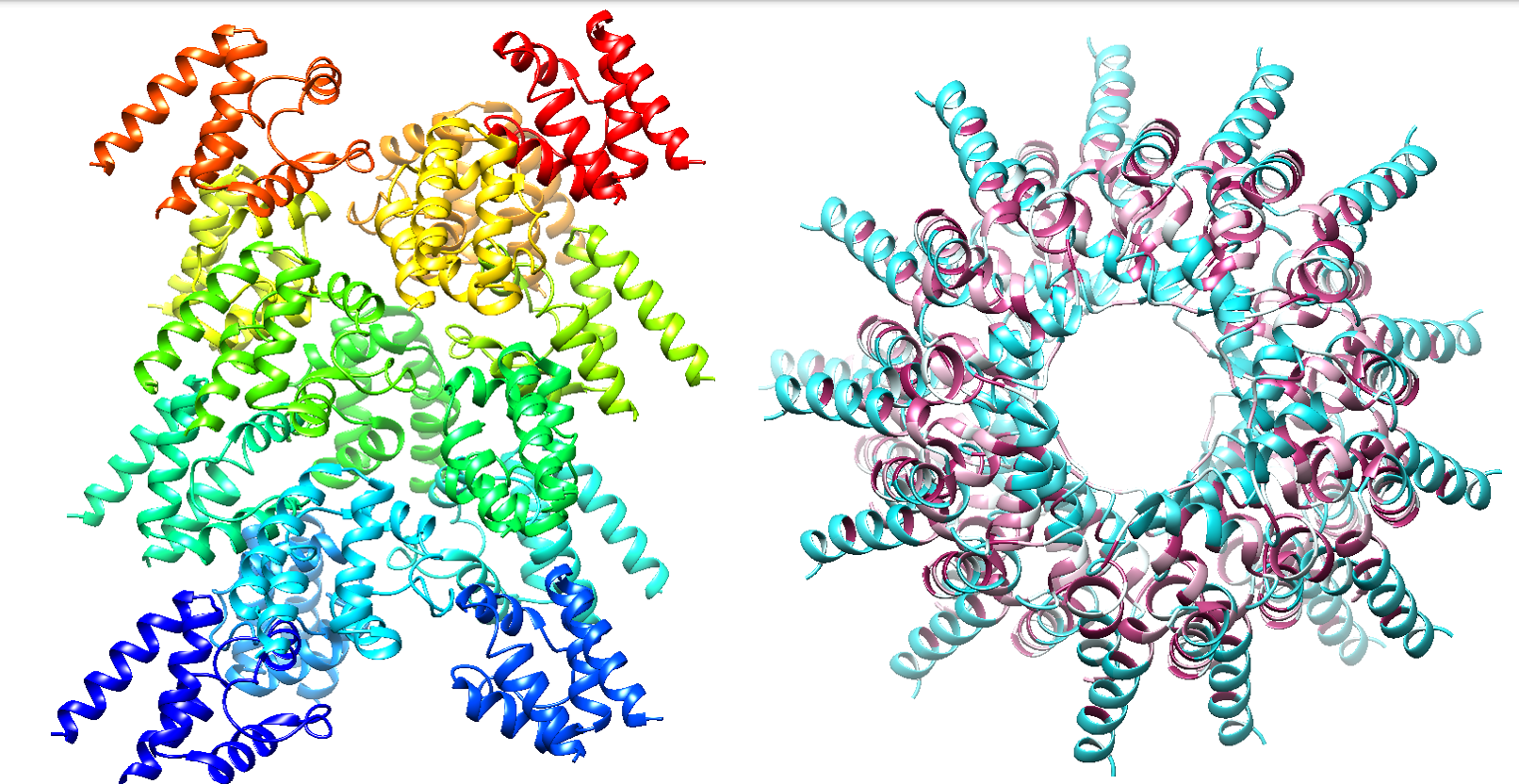
(Left) Side view of the Cryo-EM structure of AIM2 PYD filaments showing homotypic PYD-PYD aggregation in inflammasome assembly. (Right) Top-down view of the same filaments with hydrophobic residues in cyan, forming symmetry around the center. Both rendered in UCSF chimera.

A pyrin domain (PYD, also known as PAAD/DAPIN) is a protein domain and a subclass of protein motif known as the death fold, the 4th and most recently discovered member of the death domain superfamily (DDF). It was initially discovered in the pyrin protein, also known as marenostrin, which is encoded by MEFV. The mutation of the MEFV gene is the cause of the disease known as Familial Mediterranean Fever. The domain is encoded in 23 human proteins and at least 31 mouse genes.

Proteins containing a pyrin domain are frequently involved in programmed cell death processes, including pyroptosis and apoptosis. Proteins that possess a pyrin domain interact with the pyrin domains of other proteins to form multi-protein complexes called inflammasomes, triggering downstream immune responses.

== Structure ==
Pyrin domains are a ~90 amino acid motif present only at the N-terminus of proteins. The core is composed of highly conserved hydrophobic residues surrounded by five or six alpha helices with α1→2 linkages. The hydrophobic core allows self-oligomerization into punctate or speckled filamentous formations. Polar residues on the surface of the domain will enable the formation of the characteristic homotypic PYD-PYD interactions. Acidic residues are typically located in the α2 and α3 helices, while basic residues are located on the α1 and α4 helices. Compared to other members of the DDF, they contain a distinctly elongated α2-α3 loop. This loop, especially α3, is highly variable among PYDs of different proteins, which allows binding specificity with other PYDs of the same type.

== Function ==
Proteins containing PYDs function as cytosolic pattern recognition receptors (PRRs) that sense damage-associated molecular patterns (DAMPs) and pathogen-associated molecular patterns (PAMPs). Homotypic interactions between PYDs in receptor and adaptor proteins trigger the downstream formation of the inflammasome.

First, receptor proteins (such as NLRs and ALRs) are activated by their putative DAMP or PAMP ligands. These receptors undergo a conformational change, exposing their PYD. Generally, an adaptor protein (ASC) containing both a PYD and a caspase recruitment domain (CARD) is recruited, forming a PYD-PYD electrostatic interaction with the receptor's domain. More ASC-PYDs spontaneously self-oligomerize and form a multi-protein complex called an inflammasome. Pro-caspase-1 and caspase-8 are activated through an induced proximity mechanism. Caspase activity regulates multiple downstream pathways to trigger pyroptosis and the secretion of pro-inflammatory cytokines.

== Types ==
Types of proteins containing a PYD include adaptors, apoptosis-associated speck-like protein containing a CARD (ASC), regulatory proteins such as pyrin or pyrin-only proteins (POPs), receptors like NOD-like receptors containing a pyrin domain (NLRPs), and AIM2-like receptors (ALRs).

=== ASC ===
ASC is an adaptor protein that is part of apoptosis, pro-caspase 1 recruitment and activation, as well as NF-κB transcription factor activation. ASC contains only two domains: the PYD at the N-terminus and a CARD at the C-terminus. PYD interactions between ASC lead to oligomerization, forming puncta or "specks" that become visible microscopically. The CARD recruits pro-caspase-1, which undergoes proximity-induced autocleavage to form the active caspase-1, which in turn triggers maturation of IL-1β and IL-18.

=== NLRPs ===
NOD-like receptors exist in an inactive form until their ligand induces a conformational change. Some NLRs, such as NLRP1 and NLRP2, have a straightforward mechanism by which the receptor binds to a PAMP, triggering its activation, oligomerization and PYD-PYD ASC recruitment. In contrast, NLRP3 (also known as cryopyrin) is the most well-studied NLR with a pyrin domain and has several diverse agonists. Proposed methods of its activation are more nuanced, involving intermediate effectors rather than a direct ligand-receptor interaction. An efflux of ATP due to tissue damage leading to an increase in Ca^{2+}, mitochondrial reactive oxygen species production due to cellular stress and lysosomal rupture releasing excess H^{+} have all been proposed to inhibit different cofactors that normally inactivate NLRP3.

=== ALRs ===
Absent in melanoma 2-like (AIM2-like) receptors function as recognition of foreign double-stranded DNA. Two ALRs with pyrin domains, AIM2 and IFI16, assemble inflammasomes; AIM2 in the cytosol and IFI16 moves between the nucleus and cytosol, functioning as a nuclear pathogen sensor. Unlike NLRPs, which function in cytosolic PAMP and DAMP recognition, ALRs mainly act within the nucleus, oligomerizing along the DNA staircase.

=== POPs ===
Pyrin-only proteins are unlike other PYD-containing proteins which contain a PYD with one or more other domains. Different POPs have electrostatic and structural similarities to the specific PYD they regulate. Most are encoded near the same genes as the pyrin-containing proteins they inhibit; POP1 and POP2 are postulated to have arisen by exon duplication. Since most inflammasomes are formed by aggregation due to PYD-PYD interactions, POPs instead bind to PYDs preventing polymerization and therefore regulating and/or resolving inflammation response.

PYD domain containing proteins
Type	Subtype	Name	Stimulation signals	Function	Associated Diseases [5]
Adaptor		ASC	PAMPs or DAMPs binding to NLRPs or ALRs	Apoptosis, caspase activation, forms “specks” [2]	N/A
Pattern Recognition Receptors (PRRs)	Nucleotide-binding Leucine-rich Repeating with a Pyrin Domain or NOD-like Receptors (NLRPs)	NLRP1	Bacterial toxins, intracellular ATP depletion, muramyl dipeptide	Caspase-1 and, uniquely, caspase-5 recruitment and ASC complex assembly	Arthritis, dyskeratosis, Chron's disease, hyper-inflammation (1)
Pattern Recognition Receptors (PRRs)	Nucleotide-binding Leucine-rich Repeating with a Pyrin Domain or NOD-like Receptors (NLRPs)	NLRP2	Downstream cytokine inhibition in response to immune suppressive monoclonal antibodies anti-CD3 and anti-CD28	Inflammasome assembly	N/A
Pattern Recognition Receptors (PRRs)	Nucleotide-binding Leucine-rich Repeating with a Pyrin Domain or NOD-like Receptors (NLRPs)	NLRP3	Extracellular ATP, Crystalline & Particulate structures (silica, alum, asbestos, amyloid-beta)	Possible link to ROS and redox signaling [1]	Cryopyrin-associated periodic syndromes, familial cold autoinflammatory syndrome, Muckle–Wells syndrome
Pattern Recognition Receptors (PRRs)	Nucleotide-binding Leucine-rich Repeating with a Pyrin Domain or NOD-like Receptors (NLRPs)	NLRP4	Cytosolic bacterial flagellin (i.e. Salmonella typhimurium) Type II secretion system components (i.e. Escherichia coli)	Modulates type I IFN signaling (5)	Enterocolitis, macrophage activation syndrome (MAS)
Pattern Recognition Receptors (PRRs)	Nucleotide-binding Leucine-rich Repeating with a Pyrin Domain or NOD-like Receptors (NLRPs)	NLRP6	Inflammation inducing and imbalanced gut microflora	Maintenance of intestinal homeostasis	Colitis, colitis induced tumorigenesis, non-alcoholic fatty liver disease
Pattern Recognition Receptors (PRRs)	Nucleotide-binding Leucine-rich Repeating with a Pyrin Domain or NOD-like Receptors (NLRPs)	NLRP7	S. aureus, L. monocytogenes, lysosomal damage, bacterial acylated lipoproteins	Both pro and anti-inflammatory responses	Downregulation of IL-1β and TNFα in lymphocytes and monocytes in human patients with NLRP7 mutations
Pattern Recognition Receptors (PRRs)	Nucleotide-binding Leucine-rich Repeating with a Pyrin Domain or NOD-like Receptors (NLRPs)	NLRP10	S. flexneri, C. albicans	Interacts with nodosome signaling	Defective TF1 and TF7 immune response to autoimmune encephalomyelitis in mice
Pattern Recognition Receptors (PRRs)	Nucleotide-binding Leucine-rich Repeating with a Pyrin Domain or NOD-like Receptors (NLRPs)	NLRP12	Yersinia pestis	Negative regulator for pro-inflammatory cytokines	Impaired chemokine response causing defects in migration of dendritic cells and lymph drainage
Pattern Recognition Receptors (PRRs)	Nucleotide-binding Leucine-rich Repeating with a Pyrin Domain or NOD-like Receptors (NLRPs)	NLRP14	Not linked to inflammasome activation or ASC interaction	Elusive function, unique dimerization in crystal structure	N/A
Pattern Recognition Receptors (PRRs)	Hematopoietic Interferon-Inducing Nuclear Proteins with 200 Amino Acid Repeat (HIN-200)	AIM2	Cytosolic viral dsDNA or bacteria (i.e. papillomavirus, Mycobacterium tuberculosis)	Inflammasome formation along the DNA staircase	Susceptibility to F. tularensis and cytomegalovirus in mice
Pattern Recognition Receptors (PRRs)	Hematopoietic Interferon-Inducing Nuclear Proteins with 200 Amino Acid Repeat (HIN-200)	IFI16	Latent viral DNA in nucleus and cytoplasm	Induces IFN- β in cytoplasm and inflammasome activating PRR	Sjogren's syndrome, systemic lupus erythematosus
Other		pyrin	Rho-GTPase inactivation (i.e. B. pertussis (pertussis toxin), B. cenocepacia (nosocomial pneumonia), C. botulinum (botulism), C. difficile (colitis), H. somni (TEME in cattle), V. parahaeomolyticus (acute gastroenteritis), Y. Pestis (plague)	Controls ASC-mediated apoptosis	Familial Mediterranean fever (FMF), mevalonate kinase deficiency (MKD), hyperimmunoglobulinemia D syndrome (HIDS)
