= Caspase 1 =

Enzyme found in humans

CASP1
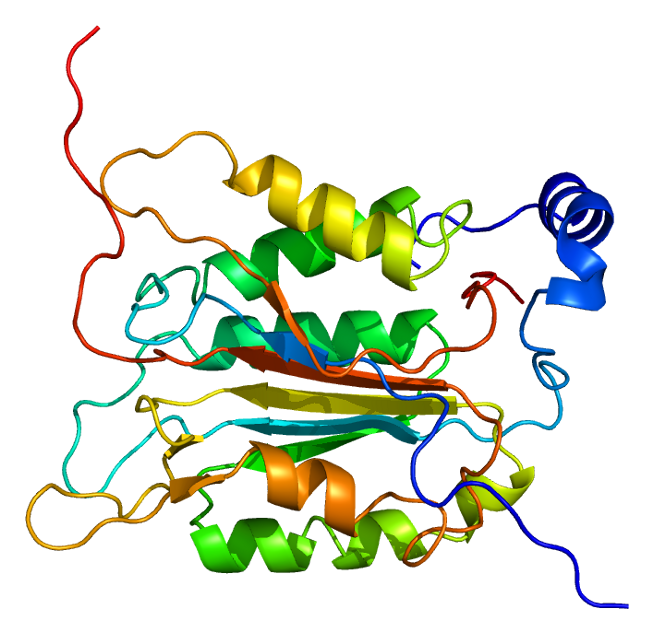

Identifiers
- Aliases: CASP1, ICE, IL1BC, P45, caspase 1
- External IDs: OMIM: 147678; MGI: 96544; GeneCards: CASP1
Available structures
PDB	Ortholog search: PDBe RCSB
PDB	List of PDB id codes 1BMQ, 1IBC, 1ICE, 1RWK, 1RWM, 1RWN, 1RWO, 1RWP, 1RWV, 1RWW, 1RWX, 1SC1, 1SC3, 1SC4, 2FQQ, 2H48, 2H4W, 2H4Y, 2H51, 2H54, 2HBQ, 2HBR, 2HBY, 2HBZ, 3D6F, 3D6H, 3D6M, 3E4C, 3NS7, 5FNA
Enzyme activity
EC #	BRENDA	ExPASy	KEGG	MetaCyc
3.4.22.36	↗	↗	↗	↗

Gene location (Human)
Chr.	Chromosome 11 (human)
Band	11q22.3	Start	105,025,397 bp
Band	11q22.3	End	105,035,250 bp

Gene location (Mouse)
Chr.	Chromosome 9 (mouse)
Band	9 A1|9 2.46 cM	Start	5,298,508 bp
Band	9 A1|9 2.46 cM	End	5,307,290 bp
RNA expression pattern
Bgee	Human / Mouse (ortholog); Top expressed in: monocyte; granulocyte; blood; jejunal mucosa; spleen; appendix; mucosa of ileum; duodenum; rectum; stromal cell of endometrium / Top expressed in: Paneth cell; colon; ileum; left colon; jejunum; duodenum; epithelium of small intestine; granulocyte; crypt of lieberkuhn of small intestine; intestinal villus; More reference expression data
BioGPS	n/a
Gene ontology
Molecular function	cysteine-type peptidase activity; endopeptidase activity; peptidase activity; protein binding; cysteine-type endopeptidase activator activity involved in apoptotic process; hydrolase activity; cysteine-type endopeptidase activity involved in execution phase of apoptosis; cysteine-type endopeptidase activity involved in apoptotic process; kinase binding; cysteine-type endopeptidase activity; CARD domain binding; identical protein binding; cysteine-type endopeptidase activity involved in apoptotic signaling pathway
Cellular component	NLRP3 inflammasome complex; cytoplasm; cytosol; NLRP1 inflammasome complex; extracellular region; AIM2 inflammasome complex; mitochondrion; IPAF inflammasome complex; protease inhibitor complex; protein-containing complex
Biological process	cellular response to organic substance; response to ATP; response to hypoxia; response to bacterium; membrane hyperpolarization; pyroptosis; protein processing; toxin transport; proteolysis; cellular response to mechanical stimulus; response to lipopolysaccharide; regulation of autophagy; interleukin-1 beta production; mitochondrial depolarization; programmed necrotic cell death; signal transduction; apoptotic process; regulation of apoptotic process; activation of cysteine-type endopeptidase activity involved in apoptotic process; regulation of inflammatory response; execution phase of apoptosis; cellular response to lipopolysaccharide; cellular response to interferon-gamma; protein autoprocessing; positive regulation of cysteine-type endopeptidase activity involved in apoptotic process; positive regulation of tumor necrosis factor-mediated signaling pathway; positive regulation of I-kappaB kinase/NF-kappaB signaling; cytokine-mediated signaling pathway; cellular response to cytokine stimulus; apoptotic signaling pathway; positive regulation of interleukin-1 beta production
Sources:Amigo / QuickGO
Orthologs
Databases	NCBI: entry; OMA: entry
Species	Human	Mouse
Entrez	834	12362
Ensembl	ENSG00000137752	ENSMUSG00000025888
UniProt	P29466	P29452
RefSeq (mRNA)	NM_001223; NM_001257118; NM_001257119; NM_033292; NM_033293 NM_033294; NM_033295	NM_009807
RefSeq (protein)	NP_001214; NP_001244047; NP_001244048; NP_150634; NP_150635 NP_150636; NP_150637	NP_033937
Location (UCSC)	Chr 11: 105.03 – 105.04 Mb	Chr 9: 5.3 – 5.31 Mb
PubMed search
- Wikidata
View/Edit Human	View/Edit Mouse

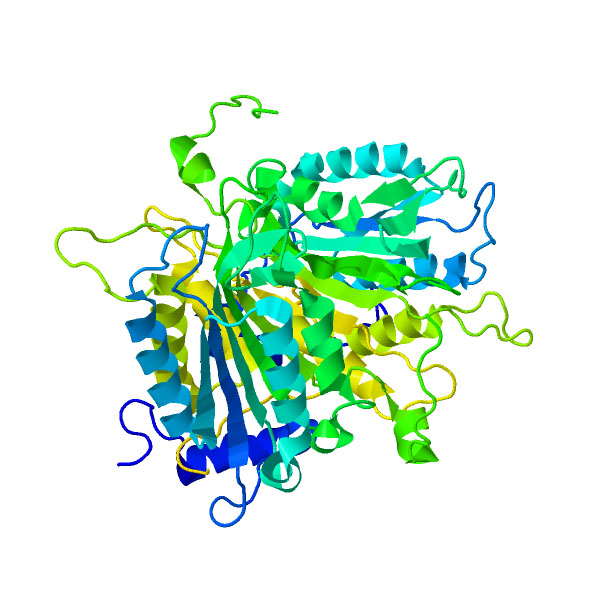
Caspase-1 Zymogen

Caspase-1/Interleukin-1 converting enzyme (ICE) is an evolutionarily conserved enzyme that proteolytically cleaves other proteins, such as the precursors of the inflammatory cytokines interleukin 1β and interleukin 18 as well as the pyroptosis inducer Gasdermin D, into active mature peptides. It plays a central role in cell immunity as an inflammatory response initiator. Once activated through formation of an inflammasome complex, it initiates a proinflammatory response through the cleavage and thus activation of the two inflammatory cytokines, interleukin 1β (IL-1β) and interleukin 18 (IL-18) as well as pyroptosis, a programmed lytic cell death pathway, through cleavage of Gasdermin D. The two inflammatory cytokines activated by Caspase-1 are excreted from the cell to further induce the inflammatory response in neighboring cells.

== Cellular expression ==
Caspase-1 is evolutionarily conserved in many eukaryotes of the Kingdom Animalia. Due to its role in the inflammatory immune response, it is highly expressed in the immune organs such as the liver, kidney, spleen, and blood (neutrophils). Following infection, the inflammatory response increases expression of Caspase-1, by a positive feedback mechanism that amplifies the response.

== Structure ==
Caspase-1 is produced as a zymogen that can then be cleaved into 20 kDa (p20) and 10 kDa (p10) subunits that become part of the active enzyme. Active caspase 1 contains two heterodimers of p20 and p10. It contains a catalytic domain with an active site that spans both the p20 and p10 subunits, as well as a noncatalytic caspase activation and recruitment domain (CARD). It interacts with other CARD-containing proteins such as apoptosis-associated Speck-like protein containing a CARD (ASC) and Nod-like receptor (NLR) family CARD domain–containing protein 4 (NLRC4) through CARD–CARD interactions in the formation of inflammasomes.

== Regulation ==
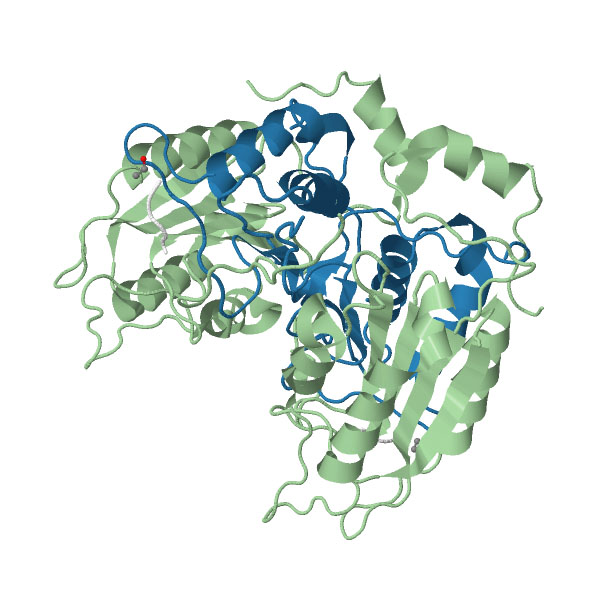
Inhibited Caspase-1 with 10kDA (Blue) and 20kDA (Green) subunits highlighted

Example inflammasome structure. The center of the structure is the catalytic domain, outer legs are the sensory domains.

=== Activation ===
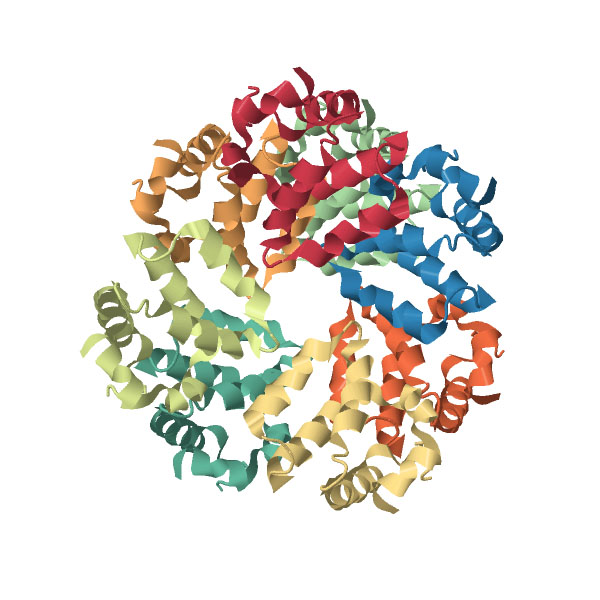
CARD-CARD Interaction Mediated Ring Formation

Caspase-1, normally in its physiologically inactive zymogen form, autoactivates when it is assembled into the filamentous inflammasome complex by autoproteolysis into the p10 and p20 subunits. The inflammasome complex is a ring complex composed of trimers of a signal specific sensor protein such as those of the NLR family and the AIM-1 (Absent in Melanoma) like receptors, an adaptor protein such as ASC, and a caspase, in this case Caspase-1. In some cases, where the signaling proteins contain their own CARDs, like in NLRP1 and NLRC4, the CARD–CARD interaction is direct, meaning there is no adaptor protein in the complex. There are a variety of sensor and adaptor proteins, the various combinations of which confer the inflammasomes' responses to specific signals. This allows the cell to have varying degrees of inflammatory responses based on the severity of the danger signal received.

=== Inhibition ===
CARD only proteins (COPs) as their name implies, are proteins that only contain the non-catalytic CARDs. Owing to the importance of CARD-CARD interactions in inflammasome formation, many COPs are known inhibitors of Caspase activation. For Caspase-1, genes for specific COPs—ICEBERG, COP1 (ICE/Pseudo-ICE), and INCA (Inhibitory Card)—are all found near its locus, and are thus thought to have emerged from gene duplication events and subsequent deletions of the catalytic domains. Though they all interact with the inflammasomes using CARD–CARD interactions, they differ in the way they carry out their inhibitory functions as well as in their effectiveness at doing so.

For example, ICEBERG nucleates the formation of Caspase-1 filaments and is thus incorporated into the filaments, but lacks the ability to inhibit the activation of inflammasomes. Instead, it is thought to inhibit Caspase-1 activation by interfering with the interaction of Caspase-1 with other important CARD containing proteins.

INCA, on the other hand, directly blocks inflammasome assembly by capping Caspase-1 CARD oligomers, thus blocking further polymerization into the inflammasome filaments.

Similarly, some POPs (Pyrin only proteins) are also known to regulate Caspase-1 activation through inhibition of inflammasome activation by binding to and blocking PYD interactions, which also play a role in the formation of the inflammasomes, though the exact mechanisms are not yet well established.

Inhibitors

- Belnacasan (VX-765)
- Pralnacasan (VX-740)

== Function ==
=== Proteolytic cleavage ===
Activated Caspase 1 proteolytically cleaves pro IL-1β and pro IL-18 into their active forms, IL-1β and IL-18. The active cytokines lead to a downstream inflammatory response. It also cleaves Gasdermin D into its active form, which leads to pyroptosis.

=== Inflammatory response ===
Once matured, the cytokines initiate downstream signaling events to induce a proinflammatory response as well as to activate the expression of antiviral genes. The speed, specificity and types of response are dependent on the signal received as well as the sensor protein that received it. Signals that can be received by the inflammasomes include viral double stranded RNA, urea, free radicals, and other signals associated with cellular danger, even byproducts of other immune response pathways.

The mature cytokines themselves do not contain the necessary sorting sequences to enter the ER–Golgi secretory pathway, and thus are not excreted from the cell by conventional methods. However, it is theorized that the release of these proinflammatory cytokines is not reliant on cellular rupture via pyroptosis, and is in fact, an active process. There exists evidence both for and against this hypothesis. The fact that for many cell types, the cytokines are secreted despite them showing absolutely no signs of pyroptosis, supports this hypothesis. However, some experiments show that Gasdermin D nonfunctional mutants still had normal cleavage of the cytokines but lacked the ability to secrete them, indicating pyroptosis may in fact be necessary for secretion in some way.

=== Pyroptosis response ===
Following the inflammatory response, an activated Caspase-1 can induce pyroptosis, a lytic form of cell death, depending on the signal received as well as the specific inflammasome sensor domain protein that received it. Though pyroptosis may or may not be required for the full inflammatory response, the inflammatory response is fully required before pyroptosis can occur. In order to induce pyroptosis, Caspase-1 cleaves Gasdermin D into fragments that form pores in the plasma membrane. As a result of osmotic pressure, these pores promote the influx of fluid, resulting in cell lysis and death.

=== Other roles ===
Caspase-1 has also been shown to induce necrosis and may also function in various developmental stages. Studies of a similar protein in mice suggest a role in the pathogenesis of Huntington's disease. Alternative splicing of the gene results in five transcript variants encoding distinct isoforms. Recent studies implicated caspase-1 in promoting CD4 T-cell death and inflammation by HIV, two signature events that fuel HIV disease progression to AIDS. Caspase-1 activity has also been implicated in lysosome acidification following phagocytosis of bacteria and immune complexes.

== See also ==
- The Proteolysis Map
- Caspase
- Pyroptosis
- Inflammation
- Inflammasome
