= MALT1 =

Protein-coding gene in humans

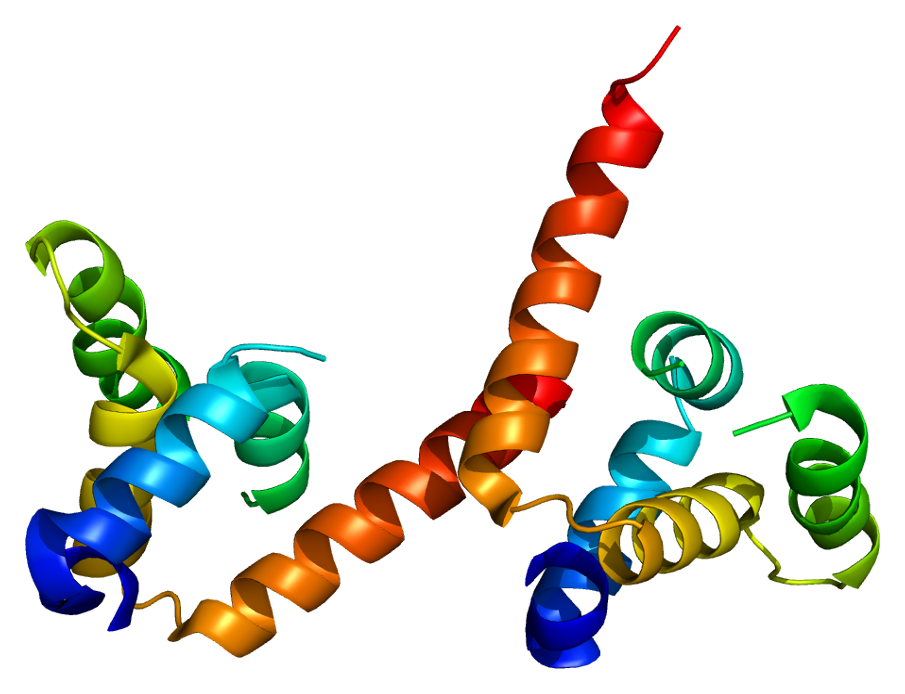

Identifiers
- Aliases: MALT1, IMD12, MLT, MLT1, PCASP1, MALT1 paracaspase
- External IDs: OMIM: 604860; MGI: 2445027; GeneCards: MALT1
Available structures
PDB	Ortholog search: PDBe RCSB
PDB	List of PDB id codes 2G7R, 3BFO, 3K0W, 3UO8, 3UOA, 3V4O, 3V55, 4I1P, 4I1R

Gene location (Human)
Chr.	Chromosome 18 (human)
Band	18q21.32	Start	58,671,465 bp
Band	18q21.32	End	58,754,477 bp

Gene location (Mouse)
Chr.	Chromosome 18 (mouse)
Band	18|18 E1	Start	65,564,009 bp
Band	18|18 E1	End	65,612,138 bp
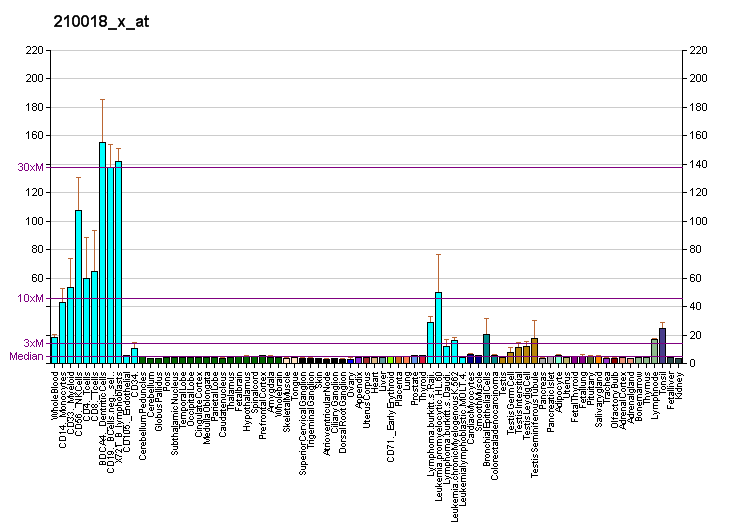

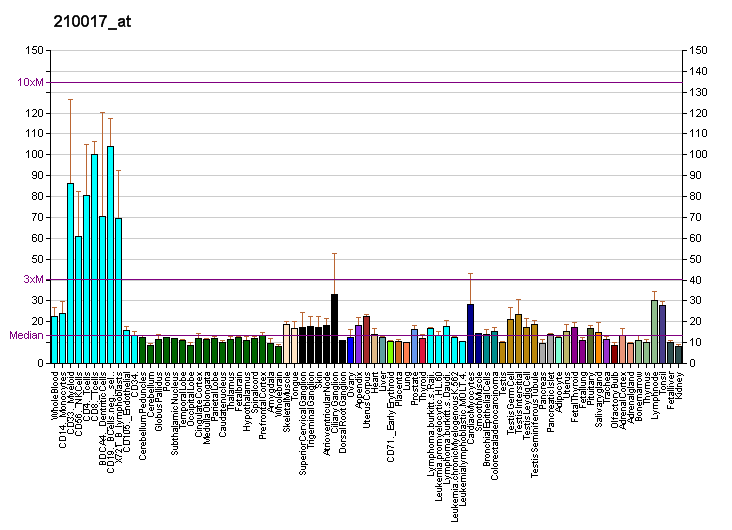

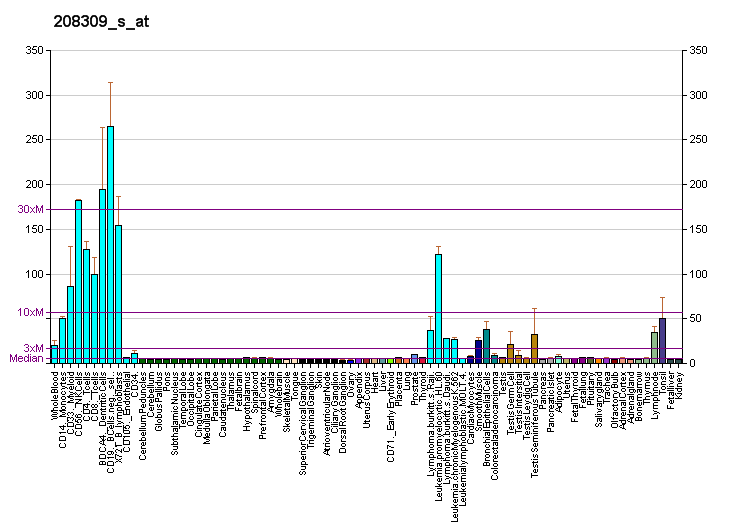
RNA expression pattern
Bgee	Human / Mouse (ortholog); Top expressed in: epithelium of colon; tonsil; testicle; Achilles tendon; monocyte; gonad; lymph node; buccal mucosa cell; appendix; stromal cell of endometrium / Top expressed in: spleen; mesenteric lymph nodes; granulocyte; tail of embryo; blood; subcutaneous adipose tissue; genital tubercle; neural layer of retina; interventricular septum; muscle of thigh; More reference expression data
BioGPS	More reference expression data
Gene ontology
Molecular function	signal transducer activity; ubiquitin-protein transferase activity; protease binding; protein self-association; peptidase activity; protein binding; kinase activator activity; cysteine-type endopeptidase activity; hydrolase activity; identical protein binding
Cellular component	cytoplasm; plasma membrane; nucleolus; perinuclear region of cytoplasm; nucleus; fibrillar center; cytosol; CBM complex
Biological process	regulation of apoptotic process; defense response; regulation of T cell receptor signaling pathway; negative regulation of apoptotic process; stimulatory C-type lectin receptor signaling pathway; activation of NF-kappaB-inducing kinase activity; proteolysis; Fc-epsilon receptor signaling pathway; T cell proliferation; B cell activation; response to fungus; positive regulation of T cell activation; positive regulation of interleukin-2 production; protein complex oligomerization; positive regulation of T cell cytokine production; positive regulation of I-kappaB kinase/NF-kappaB signaling; nuclear export; B-1 B cell differentiation; response to molecule of bacterial origin; positive regulation of protein ubiquitination; T cell receptor signaling pathway; protein ubiquitination; innate immune response; positive regulation of NF-kappaB transcription factor activity
Sources:Amigo / QuickGO
Orthologs
Databases	NCBI: entry; OMA: entry
Species	Human	Mouse
Entrez	10892	240354
Ensembl	ENSG00000172175	ENSMUSG00000032688
UniProt	Q9UDY8	Q2TBA3
RefSeq (mRNA)	NM_006785; NM_173844	NM_172833; NM_001365019
RefSeq (protein)	NP_006776; NP_776216	NP_766421; NP_001351948
Location (UCSC)	Chr 18: 58.67 – 58.75 Mb	Chr 18: 65.56 – 65.61 Mb
PubMed search
- Wikidata
View/Edit Human	View/Edit Mouse

Mucosa-associated lymphoid tissue lymphoma translocation protein 1 is a protein that in humans is encoded by the MALT1 gene. It is the human paracaspase.

== Gene ==
Two alternatively spliced transcript variants encoding different isoforms have been described for this gene.

== Structure ==
Sequence analysis proposes MALT1 has an N-terminal death domain, two central immunoglobulin-like domains involved in the binding to the B-cell lymphoma 10 (BCL10) protein and a caspase-like (paracaspase) domain.

The death domain and immunoglobulin-like domains participate in binding to BCL10.

== Function ==
=== Immune signaling ===
In response to receptor stimulation, an activated member of the CARD-CC family (CARD9, CARD10, CARD11, or CARD14) recruits BCL10 and MALT1 to form a CARD–BCL10–MALT1 (CBM) signaling complex. Within the complex, MALT1 acts as a scaffold by recruiting TRAF6, which promotes activation of the transcription factor NF-κB.

In mice, loss of MALT1 impairs NF-κB activation, interleukin-2 (IL-2) production, and proliferation in response to T-cell receptor stimulation. MALT1 also contributes to B-cell activation, although its importance depends on the signaling context.

In innate immunity, MALT1 participates in signaling downstream of Dectin-1, a receptor that recognizes zymosan, in macrophages and dendritic cells. MALT1 also participates in signaling downstream of certain G protein-coupled receptors.

MALT1 also contributes to mTOR activation downstream of the T-cell receptor. In keratinocytes, CARD14 signaling complexes containing MALT1 have been linked to mTORC1 activation and cell proliferation.

=== Protease activity ===
Assembly of the CBM complex brings MALT1 molecules into proximity, allowing their paracaspase domains to dimerize and activate the protease. MALT1 (PCASP1) is part of the paracaspase family and shows proteolytic activity. Since many of the substrates are involved in regulation of inflammatory responses, the protease activity of MALT1 has emerged as an interesting therapeutic target. The general pattern of MALT1 substrate specificity is a hydrophobic amino acid at P4 and small uncharged residues surrounding (P2 and P1') the substrate (P1) arginine. There are however exceptions to this rule. For example, the tetrapeptide GASR is a poor substrate, and for A20 it has been shown that the P5 leucine (LGASR) is required for A20 cleavage. Currently known protease substrates are (in order of reported discovery):

MALT1 protease substrates
Substrate	Reference	Cleavage sequence
A20 (TNFAIP3)		LGASR/G
BCL10		LRSR/T
CYLD		FMSR/G
RELB		LVSR/G
regnase-1/MCPIP1 (ZC3H12A)		LVPR/G
Roquin-1 (RC3H1)		LIPR/G
Roquin-2 (RC3H2)		LISR/S
MALT1 auto-proteolysis		LCCR/A
MALT1 auto-proteolysis		HCSR/T
HOIL1 (RBCK1)		LQPR/G
N4BP1		FVSR/G
CARD10		LRCR/G
ZC3H12D		LVPR/G
ZC3H12B		LVPR/G
TAB3		LQSR/G
CASP10		LVSR/G
CILK1		LISR/S
ILDR2		GASR/G LVSR/T GASR/G
TANK		HIPR/V

MALT1, being a paracaspase, has been shown to have proteolytic activity through its caspase-like domain in T lymphocytes and other cell types. Cysteine 464 and histidine 414 are crucial for this activity. Like metacaspases, the paracaspase cleaves substrates after an arginine residue. To date, several paracaspase substrates have been described (see below). The role of specific substrate cleavage events are unclear, but the MALT1 protease activity plays a critical role in the regulation of the immune system.

"Protease dead" knock-in mice where the MALT1 catalytic cysteine has been mutated to an alanine show lethal autoimmunity, and conditional mutant mice have shown that this MALT1 protease-dependent immune regulation is taking place in T cells, and especially in regulatory T cells. The lethal autoimmunity is driven by IFNγ-producing T cells. Until now, no uncleavable knock-in substrate mutant mouse has replicated this phenotype, which means that it is unclear how MALT1 protease activity is regulating immune homeostasis. Interestingly, it seems like MALT1 protease inhibition in adult animals leads to a less severe autoimmunity, which might indicate that thymic regulatory T cells, which develop at an early age, are important for the suppression of autoimmunity. This is also encouraging for the potential therapeutic use of MALT1 protease inhibitors:

By targeting MALT1 proteolytic activity, it might be possible to develop new drugs that might be useful for the treatment of certain lymphomas, solid tumors or autoimmune disorders. Not only by affecting the cancer cells themselves, but also to enhance immune check point inhibition by suppressing regulatory T cells, enhance cancer cell killing by promoting IFNγ-producing T cells, and possibly also influence the polarization of tumor-associated macrophages towards a more pro-inflammatory phenotype.

== Clinical significance ==
=== MALT lymphoma ===
In a subset of MALT lymphomas, the t(11;18)(q21;q21) chromosomal translocation fuses BIRC3 (also known as API2) with MALT1, producing the BIRC3::MALT1 fusion protein, also called API2–MALT1.

The fusion protein cleaves NF-κB-inducing kinase (NIK), activating the noncanonical NF-κB pathway. It also cleaves the tumour suppressor LIMA1, releasing a fragment with oncogenic activity.

=== Inherited MALT1 deficiency ===
MALT1 plays a critical role in the adaptive immunity also in humans, and patients deficient for MALT1 show combined immunodeficiency (CID), failure to thrive, osteoporosis and atopic dermatitis.

The osteoporosis and atopic dermatitis phenotypes have been replicated in Malt1 knock out mice. Conditional Malt1 mouse models show that the osteoporosis phenotype is dependent on MALT1 in T cells. On the other hand, it is still unknown what cell type is responsible for the atopic dermatitis phenotype (T cells and keratinocytes are excluded).

== Research ==
=== Protease inhibitors ===
Since MALT1 protease activity is a promising therapeutic target, different screenings have been performed which have resulted in different types of protease inhibitors. There is active competition between multiple pharma companies and independent research groups in drug development against the MALT1 protease activity.

===== Active site inhibitors =====
- Substrate peptide-based active-site inhibitor: Initially described with the metacaspase inhibitor VRPR-fmk. Others have developed peptide inhibitors based on the optimal peptide sequence (LVSR) or further chemical modifications.
- Janssen Pharmaceutica is currently performing a clinical trial with this class of inhibitors.
- A molecular modeling approach led to the development of the small molecule active site inhibitor MI-2.

===== Allosteric inhibitors =====
- Phenothiazine compounds like mepazine and chlorpromazine (which have been used clinically for neurological/psychological conditions) have been found to be allosteric inhibitors of MALT1 protease activity.
- Biperiden, like phenothiazines, act as a MALT1 protease inhibitor and show promising results against pancreatic cancer.
- Quinoline and thiazolopyridine allosteric MALT1 protease inhibitors have been demonstrated to work in mouse disease models.
- Novartis is developing pyrazolopyrimidine derivative MALT1 protease inhibitors.
- AstraZeneca is developing MALT1 protease inhibitors.
- Lupin and AbbVie are developing MALT1 protease inhibitors.
- Excentia has an allosteric inhibitor

===== Natural products =====
- Analogs of β-Lapachone have been identified as MALT1 protease inhibitors.
- secondary metabolites (oxepinochromenones) from the fungus Dictyosporium show MALT1 protease inhibitory activity.

===== Unknown =====
- VIB is developing MALT1 protease inhibitors in collaboration with the Leuven-based spin-off Centre for Drug Design and Discovery (CD3)
- Chordia therapeutics is entering a clinical trial with a MALT1 protease inhibitor in 2020
- Monopteros has a MALT1 inhibitor against solid tumor cancer.
- Shrödinger has a compound in phase 1 clinical trials against mantle cell lymphoma.
- Exelixis has a "CARD11-BCL10-MALT1" complex inhibitor in phase 1 clinical trial.
- Rheos medicines has a clinical trial of their compound against autoimmune disease.

== See also ==
- Paracaspase
