= CARD-CC family =

Protein family

The CARD-CC protein family is defined by an evolutionary conserved "caspase activation and recruitment domain" (CARD) and a coiled-coil (CC) domain. Coiled-coils (CC) act as oligomerization domains for many proteins such as structural and motor proteins, and transcription factors. This means that monomers are converted to macromolecular complexes by polymerization. In humans and other jawed vertebrates, the family consists of CARD9 and the three "CARD-containing MAGUK protein" (CARMA) proteins CARD11 (CARMA1), CARD14 (CARMA2) and CARD10 (CARMA3). Although the MAGUK protein DLG5 contains both a CARD domain and a CC domain, it does not belong to the same family as the CARD-CC proteins since the evolutionary origin of its CARD domain is very likely to be different.

CARD-CC protein family structure

== Evolution and species distribution ==
The protein family is ancient and can be found as far back as Cnidaria, but has almost exclusively been studied in humans and mice. Notably, the protein family is absent in insects and nematodes, which makes it impossible to study its function in the most popular invertebrate model organisms (Drosophila and C. elegans). Invertebrates only have a CARD9-like ancestral CARD-CC member, and the earliest occurrence of a CARD-CC member with the CARMA domain composition is in the jawless vertebrate hagfish. Already in sharks are all four CARD-CC family members present, indicating that the 3 distinct CARMA CARD-CC family members were formed by two duplication events just before or very early in the jawed vertebrate evolution, almost half a billion years ago. The four CARD-CC ohnologous members in mice and humans differ in expression domains, where CARD9 is mostly expressed in myelocytes, CARD11 in lymphocytes, while CARD10 and CARD14 are mostly expressed in non-haematopoetic cells. This gene expression differentiation between the four CARD-CC family members conserved at least as far back as frogs (Xenopus tropicalis) and fish (Danio rerio), indicating that the four CARD-CC family members have had distinct functions since early jawed vertebrate evolution.

== Functions ==
A common theme for all four CARD-CC family proteins in mice and humans is that they are activated by different protein kinase C isoforms, and recruit BCL10 and the paracaspase MALT1 upon activation, forming a so-called CBM complex. There are four different CBM complexes, defined by which CARD-CC family member that is responsible for its assembly: CBM-9 (CARD9), CBM-1 (CARD11/CARMA1), CBM-2 (CARD14/CARMA2) and CBM-3 (CARD10/CARMA3). CBM complex assembly results in recruitment of TRAF6 to MALT1 and downstream activation of NF-κB transcriptional activity and expression of pro-inflammatory cytokines. The different CARD-CC family members show different expression pattern and gain- or loss of function mutation in the different CARD-CC family proteins cause different phenotypes.

Graphical overview of signaling pathways dependent on a CARD-CC family member

- Loss-of-function mutations in CARD9 disrupts lectin receptor signaling like Dectin 1, which causes enhanced susceptibility to fungal infections.
- Gain-of-function variants in CARD9 appear to be associated to fibromyalgia, and possibly the comorbidities constipation, Irritable bowel syndrome and other psychosomatic sequelæ in the UK biobank association between exome sequences and health data.
- Strong loss-of-function mutations in CARD11 cause severe defects in lymphocyte function since it is a critical downstream signal mediator in T- and B-cell antigen receptor signaling, which results in severe combined immunodeficiency (SCID).
- Weak (hypomorphic) mutations in CARD11 causes atopic dermatitis disease.
- Gain-of-function mutations in CARD11 can result in B-cell lymphoma or BENTA.
- Gain-of-function mutations in CARD14 results in psoriasis or PRP.
- There are indications that loss-of-function mutations in CARD14 could result in atopic dermatitis due to disrupted immune responses against skin microbes.
- There are no obvious gain- or loss-of-function mutations in CARD10, but it is sometimes over-expressed in certain cancer variants, and there is a SNP in CARD10 associated to glaucoma.
