= Mir-550 microRNA precursor family =

MicroRNA molecule

mir-550

Identifiers
- Symbol: mir-550
- Rfam: RF00873
- miRBase family: MIPF0000334

Other data
- RNA type: microRNA
- Domain(s): Eukaryota;
- PDB structures: PDBe

In molecular biology mir-550 microRNA is a short RNA molecule. MicroRNAs function to regulate the expression levels of other genes by several mechanisms.

This molecule may play a role in triggering gastritis to become MALT lymphoma. It also may feature in the treatment of prolactinomas.

== See also ==
- MicroRNA
