= DLG2-AS1 =

Non-coding RNA in the species Homo sapiens

Identifiers
- Aliases: DLG2-AS1, DLG2-AS, DLG2AS, PSZA11q14, SZ-1, DLG2 antisense RNA 1
- External IDs: GeneCards: DLG2-AS1
Orthologs
Databases	NCBI: entry
Species	Human	Mouse
Entrez	100302690	n/a
Ensembl	n/a	n/a
UniProt	n a	n/a
RefSeq (mRNA)	n/a	n/a
RefSeq (protein)	n/a	n/a
Location (UCSC)	n/a	n/a
PubMed search		n/a
- Wikidata
View/Edit Human

In molecular biology, DLG2 antisense RNA (non-protein coding), also known as DLG2AS, is a human long non-coding RNA. In humans it is located on chromosome 11q14. Its expression is reduced in patients with schizophrenia. It may act as an antisense regulator of DLG2.

== See also ==
- Long noncoding RNA
