= CARD14 =

Protein-coding gene in humans

Identifiers
- Aliases: CARD14, BIMP2, CARMA2, PRP, PSORS2, PSS1, caspase recruitment domain family member 14
- External IDs: OMIM: 607211; MGI: 2386258; GeneCards: CARD14

Gene location (Human)
Chr.	Chromosome 17 (human)
Band	17q25.3	Start	80,169,992 bp
Band	17q25.3	End	80,209,331 bp

Gene location (Mouse)
Chr.	Chromosome 11 (mouse)
Band	11|11 E2	Start	119,198,594 bp
Band	11|11 E2	End	119,236,201 bp
RNA expression pattern
Bgee	Human / Mouse (ortholog); Top expressed in: skin of leg; skin of abdomen; oral cavity; endothelial cell; testicle; vagina; skin of arm; skin of thigh; mucosa of pharynx; minor salivary glands / Top expressed in: yolk sac; lip; morula; transitional epithelium of urinary bladder; ileum; esophagus; gastrula; ankle; lobe of prostate; jejunum; More reference expression data
BioGPS	n/a
Gene ontology
Molecular function	CARD domain binding
Cellular component	cytoplasm; plasma membrane
Biological process	regulation of apoptotic process; positive regulation of protein phosphorylation; negative regulation of apoptotic process; tumor necrosis factor-mediated signaling pathway; activation of NF-kappaB-inducing kinase activity; positive regulation of NF-kappaB transcription factor activity; apoptotic process
Sources:Amigo / QuickGO
Orthologs
Databases	NCBI: entry; OMA: entry
Species	Human	Mouse
Entrez	79092	170720
Ensembl	ENSG00000141527	ENSMUSG00000013483
UniProt	Q9BXL6	Q99KF0
RefSeq (mRNA)	NM_001257970; NM_024110; NM_052819; NM_001366385	NM_130886
RefSeq (protein)	NP_001244899; NP_077015; NP_438170; NP_001353314	NP_570956
Location (UCSC)	Chr 17: 80.17 – 80.21 Mb	Chr 11: 119.2 – 119.24 Mb
PubMed search
- Wikidata
View/Edit Human	View/Edit Mouse

Caspase recruitment domain-containing protein 14, also known as D-containing MAGUK protein 2 (Carma 2), is a protein in the CARD-CC protein family that in humans is encoded by the CARD14 gene.

== Structure ==
CARD14 is a multidomain scaffold protein belonging to the CARMA (CARD-CC) family, sharing structural similarities with CARD10 and CARD11. It comprises five major domains arranged from the N- to C-terminus: an N-terminal caspase recruitment domain (CARD), a LATCH linker region, a coiled-coil (CC) domain, an inhibitory domain, and a C-terminal membrane-associated guanylate kinase (MAGUK) module. The MAGUK module includes PDZ, SH3, and guanylate kinase-like subdomains.

The CARD domain, composed of six alpha-helices, mediates protein-protein interactions critical for signalosome assembly. The coiled-coil and LATCH linker domains (residues ~200–600) are common sites of pathogenic mutations linked to psoriasis and other autoinflammatory conditions. The inhibitory domain regulates autoinhibition; for example, the R547S mutation may destabilize this region, promoting constitutive activation. The PDZ domain facilitates interactions with C-terminal motifs of partner proteins, while the guanylate kinase-like domain may participate in ATP-dependent phosphorylation.

Overall, the modular architecture of CARD14 supports its role as a scaffold for multi-protein complex assembly at specialized membrane subdomains, enabling downstream signaling.

== Function ==
CARD14 functions as a scaffold in the assembly of signaling complexes that activate inflammatory pathways. It interacts with BCL10, a key regulator of NF-κB, through its CARD domain. In its inactive state, the LATCH linker region suppresses this interaction via autoinhibition.

Upon activation or overexpression, CARD14 forms a CBM signalosome complex with BCL10, MALT1, and LUBAC, leading to downstream activation of NF-κB and the mTOR pathway. Signaling is associated with post-translational modifications of BCL10, including phosphorylation and linear ubiquitination. Gain-of-function CARD14 variants can localize to endosomal compartments, where they nucleate constitutively active signalosomes in keratinocyte cultures.

== Link to psoriasis ==
The CARD14 gene was recently identified as the first gene directly linked to the most common form of psoriasis. It has been suggested that a mutation in the gene plus an environmental trigger were enough to elicit plaque psoriasis. These rare, but highly penetrant, mutations were found to disrupt an auto-inhibited state of CARD14, which leads to the independent activation of NF-κB and mTOR pathways. Pharmacological inhibition of NF-κB transcriptional targets or mTOR function in specific mouse models of CARD14-driven psoriasis have both proven to be beneficial, indicating the need of combination therapies for inflammation and proliferation phenotypes.
