= CLEC7A =

Protein-coding gene in humans

Identifiers
- Aliases: CLEC7A, BGR, CANDF4, CLECSF12, DECTIN1, CD369, SCARE2, C-type lectin domain family 7 member A, C-type lectin domain containing 7A
- External IDs: OMIM: 606264; MGI: 1861431; GeneCards: CLEC7A
Available structures
PDB	Ortholog search: PDBe RCSB
PDB	List of PDB id codes 2BPD, 2BPE, 2BPH, 2CL8

Gene location (Human)
Chr.	Chromosome 12 (human)
Band	12p13.2	Start	10,116,777 bp
Band	12p13.2	End	10,130,258 bp

Gene location (Mouse)
Chr.	Chromosome 6 (mouse)
Band	6|6 F3	Start	129,438,554 bp
Band	6|6 F3	End	129,449,742 bp
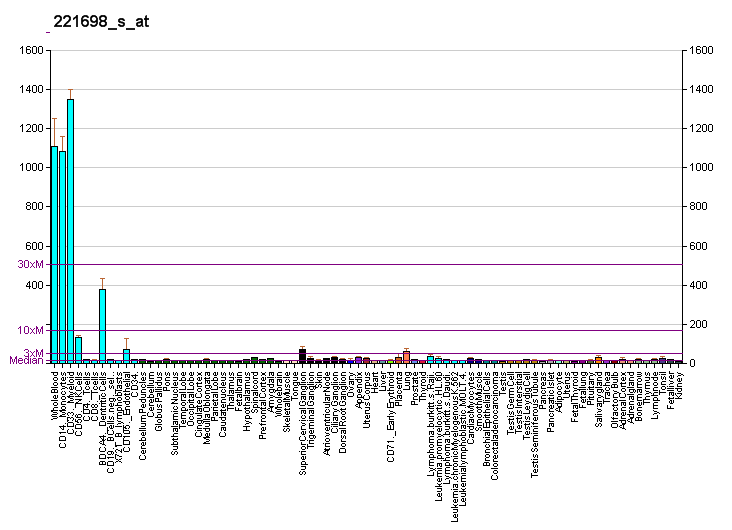
RNA expression pattern
Bgee	Human / Mouse (ortholog); Top expressed in: monocyte; granulocyte; blood; buccal mucosa cell; periodontal fiber; tendon of biceps brachii; right lung; appendix; spleen; upper lobe of left lung / Top expressed in: granulocyte; right lung lobe; blood; mesenteric lymph nodes; tibiofemoral joint; bone marrow; left lung; mucous cell of stomach; subcutaneous adipose tissue; spleen; More reference expression data
BioGPS	More reference expression data
Gene ontology
Molecular function	MHC protein binding; pattern recognition receptor activity; metal ion binding; protein binding; carbohydrate binding
Cellular component	cytoplasm; integral component of membrane; intracellular membrane-bounded organelle; membrane; plasma membrane; nucleoplasm
Biological process	cell recognition; immune system process; carbohydrate mediated signaling; phagocytosis, recognition; inflammatory response; T cell activation; defense response to protozoan; pattern recognition receptor signaling pathway; innate immune response; positive regulation of protein-containing complex assembly; positive regulation of interleukin-1 beta production; positive regulation of cysteine-type endopeptidase activity involved in apoptotic process; positive regulation of phagocytosis; positive regulation of killing of cells of other organism; positive regulation of cytokine production involved in inflammatory response
Sources:Amigo / QuickGO
Orthologs
Databases	NCBI: entry; OMA: entry
Species	Human	Mouse
Entrez	64581	56644
Ensembl	ENSG00000172243	ENSMUSG00000079293
UniProt	Q9BXN2	V9GXI5
RefSeq (mRNA)	NM_022570; NM_197947; NM_197948; NM_197949; NM_197950 NM_197951; NM_197952; NM_197953; NM_197954	NM_020008; NM_001309637
RefSeq (protein)	NP_072092; NP_922938; NP_922939; NP_922940; NP_922941 NP_922945	NP_001296566; NP_064392
Location (UCSC)	Chr 12: 10.12 – 10.13 Mb	Chr 6: 129.44 – 129.45 Mb
PubMed search
- Wikidata
View/Edit Human	View/Edit Mouse

C-type lectin domain family 7 member A or Dectin-1 is a protein that in humans is encoded by the CLEC7A gene. CLEC7A is a member of the C-type lectin/C-type lectin-like domain (CTL/CTLD) superfamily. The encoded glycoprotein is a small type II membrane receptor with an extracellular C-type lectin-like domain fold and a cytoplasmic domain with a partial immunoreceptor tyrosine-based activation motif. It functions as a pattern-recognition receptor for a variety of β-1,3-linked and β-1,6-linked glucans from fungi and plants, and in this way plays a role in innate immune response. Expression is found on myeloid dendritic cells, monocytes, macrophages and B cells. Alternate transcriptional splice variants, encoding different isoforms, have been characterized. This gene is closely linked to other CTL/CTLD superfamily members on chromosome 12p13 in the natural killer gene complex region.

== Structure ==
Dectin-1 is a transmembrane protein containing an immunoreceptor tyrosine-based activation (ITAM)-like motif in its intracellular tail (which is involved in cellular activation) and one C-type lectin-like domain (carbohydrate-recognition domain, CRD) in the extracellular region (which recognizes β-glucans and endogenous ligands on T cells). The CRD is separated from the membrane by a stalk region. CLEC7A contains putative sites of N-linked glycosylation in the stalk region.

CLEC7A is expressed by macrophages, neutrophils and dendritic cells. Expression has also been studied on other immune cells including eosinophils and B cells.

== Function ==
The C-type lectin receptors are class of signalling pattern recognition receptors which are involved in antifungal immunity, but also play important roles in immune responses to other pathogens such as bacteria, viruses and nematodes. As a member of this receptor family, dectin-1 recognizes β-glucans and carbohydrates found in fungal cell walls, some bacteria and plants, but may also recognize other unidentified molecules (endogenous ligand on T-cells and ligand on mycobacteria). Ligand binding induces intracellular signalling via the ITAM-like motif. CLEC7A can induce both Syk dependent or Syk independent pathways. Dimerization of dectin-1 upon ligand binding leads to tyrosine phosphorylation by Src family kinases and recruitment of Syk. Upon Syk recruitment is PKC-δ activated, which subsequently phosphorylates CARD9 that triggers recruitment of BCL10 and MALT1, leading to a CARD-CC/BCL10/MALT1 (CBM) signaling complex. This signaling complex in turn triggers downstream recruitment of TRAF6 and NF-κB activation. This transcription factor is responsible for the production of numerous inflammatory cytokines and chemokines such as TNF, IL-23, IL-6, IL-2. Other responses include: respiratory burst, production of arachidonic acid metabolites, dendritic cell maturation, and phagocytosis of the ligand.

=== Antifungal immunity ===
CLEC7A has been shown to recognize species of several fungal genera, including Saccharomyces, Candida, Pneumocystis, Coccidioides, Penicillium and others. Recognition of these organisms triggers many protective pathways, such as fungal uptake by phagocytosis and killing via hypochlorite generation. Activation of dectin-1 also triggers expression of many protecting antifungal cytokines and chemokines (TNF, CXCL2, IL-1β, IL-1α, CCL3, GM-CSF, G-CSF and IL-6) and the development of T_{h}17.

Histoplasma capsulatum can evade recognition of β-glucan via CLEC7A on phagocytic cells by secreting an enzyme that removes exposed β-glucans or by masking the β-glucan with α-glucan.

=== Co-stimulatory molecule ===
Also operating as a co-stimulatory molecule via recognition of an endogenous ligand on T-cells, which leads to cellular activation and proliferation, CLEC7A can bind both CD4^{+} and CD8^{+} T cells.
