= CCDC90B =

Protein-coding gene in humans

Identifiers
- Aliases: CCDC90B, MDS011, MDS025, coiled-coil domain containing 90B
- External IDs: MGI: 1913615; HomoloGene: 23328; GeneCards: CCDC90B; OMA:CCDC90B - orthologs

Gene location (Human)
Chr.	Chromosome 11 (human)
Band	11q14.1	Start	83,259,081 bp
Band	11q14.1	End	83,286,390 bp

Gene location (Mouse)
Chr.	Chromosome 7 (mouse)
Band	7|7 E1	Start	92,210,357 bp
Band	7|7 E1	End	92,231,502 bp
RNA expression pattern
Bgee	Human / Mouse (ortholog); Top expressed in: ganglionic eminence; ventricular zone; Achilles tendon; sperm; C1 segment; left testis; right testis; corpus callosum; right adrenal cortex; gonad / Top expressed in: atrioventricular valve; medial ganglionic eminence; vestibular membrane of cochlear duct; intercostal muscle; zygote; transitional epithelium of urinary bladder; vestibular sensory epithelium; epithelium of lens; endocardial cushion; secondary oocyte; More reference expression data
BioGPS	n/a
Orthologs
Species	Human	Mouse
Entrez	60492	66365
Ensembl	ENSG00000137500	ENSMUSG00000030613
UniProt	Q9GZT6	Q8C3X2
RefSeq (mRNA)	NM_001286116; NM_001286117; NM_001286118; NM_001286119; NM_001286120 NM_021825	NM_001162918; NM_025515
RefSeq (protein)	NP_001273045; NP_001273046; NP_001273047; NP_001273048; NP_001273049 NP_068597	NP_001156390; NP_079791
Location (UCSC)	Chr 11: 83.26 – 83.29 Mb	Chr 7: 92.21 – 92.23 Mb
PubMed search
- Wikidata
View/Edit Human	View/Edit Mouse

Coiled coil domain containing 90B, also known as CCDC90B, is a protein encoded by the CCDC90B gene. It is a mitochondrial calcium uniporter binding protein.

== Gene ==
CCDC90B is located on chromosome 11 in humans. It is neighbored by:

- PCF11, a mammalian pre-mRNA cleavage complex 2 protein
- ANKRD42, ankyrin repeat protein involved with calcium ion bonding
- BC070093
- DLG2, a member of the membrane-associated guanylate kinase (MAGUK) family

== Structure ==
This protein is characterized by the presence of a domain of unknown function, DUF1640. This domain is a characteristic of the entire protein with the exception of the first twenty-three amino acid residues - MNSRQAWRLFLSQGRGDRWVSRP - which are a mitochondrial targeting site and cleaved.

The protein has seven predicted alpha helices, a characteristic of coiled-coil proteins.

=== Properties ===
- Molecular Weight: 26.72 kDa
- Isoelectric point: 7.5
- Transmembrane Helices: None

Post-translation modifications:

Chloroplast transit peptides: None
Signal pepties: None
C-mannosylation sites: None
N-glycosylation sites: None
Mitochondrial targeting: Yes

Cleaved site: MNSRQAWRLFLSQGRGDRWVSRP

It is predicted to contain at least three specific phosphorylation sites: Protein Kinase C Phosphorylation sites, Casein Kinase II Phosphorylation sites, and cAMP/cGMP Dependent Phosphorylation sites.
