= Orthocaspase =

Orthocaspases is a sub-class in the C14 family of cysteine proteases. Similar to metacaspases and paracaspases, the orthocaspases cleave their protein substrates after an arginine.

== See also ==
- The Proteolysis Map
