= CARD10 =

Protein-coding gene in humans

Identifiers
- Aliases: CARD10, BIMP1, CARMA3, caspase recruitment domain family member 10, IMD89
- External IDs: OMIM: 607209; MGI: 2146012; GeneCards: CARD10

Gene location (Human)
| Chr. | Chromosome 22 (human) |
| Band | 22q13.1 | Start | 37,490,362 bp |
| Band | 22q13.1 | End | 37,519,542 bp |

Gene location (Mouse)
| Chr. | Chromosome 15 (mouse) |
| Band | 15|15 E1 | Start | 78,659,338 bp |
| Band | 15|15 E1 | End | 78,687,242 bp |
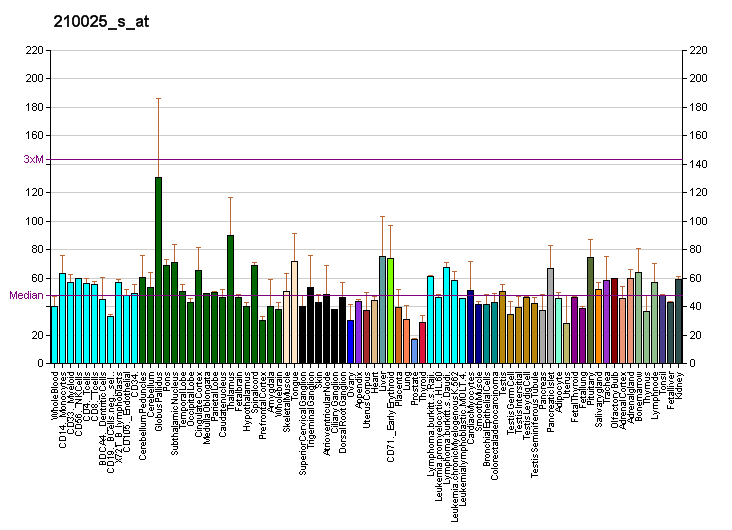

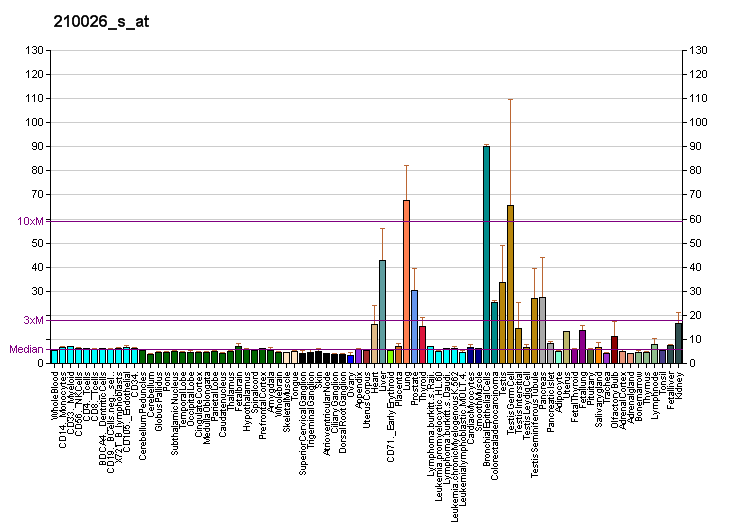
RNA expression pattern
| Bgee | Human / Mouse (ortholog); Top expressed in: parotid gland; jejunal mucosa; pancreatic ductal cell; sural nerve; duodenum; glomerulus; apex of heart; metanephric glomerulus; mucosa of transverse colon; mucosa of ileum / Top expressed in: dorsomedial hypothalamic nucleus; granulocyte; ventral tegmental area; motor neuron; vestibular membrane of cochlear duct; pontine nuclei; sciatic nerve; renal corpuscle; human kidney; utricle; More reference expression data |
| BioGPS | More reference expression data |
Gene ontology
| Molecular function | signaling receptor complex adaptor activity; protein binding; CARD domain binding |
| Cellular component | cytoplasm; CBM complex |
| Biological process | regulation of apoptotic process; activation of NF-kappaB-inducing kinase activity; negative regulation of cell migration involved in sprouting angiogenesis; positive regulation of protein localization to nucleus; protein-containing complex assembly |
Sources:Amigo / QuickGO
Orthologs
| Databases | NCBI: entry; OMA: entry |
| Species | Human | Mouse |
| Entrez | 29775 | 105844 |
| Ensembl | ENSG00000100065 | ENSMUSG00000033170 |
| UniProt | Q9BWT7 | P58660 |
| RefSeq (mRNA) | NM_014550 | NM_130859 |
| RefSeq (protein) | NP_055365 | NP_570929 |
| Location (UCSC) | Chr 22: 37.49 – 37.52 Mb | Chr 15: 78.66 – 78.69 Mb |
| PubMed search |
- Wikidata
| View/Edit Human | View/Edit Mouse |

Caspase recruitment domain-containing protein 10 is a protein in the CARD-CC protein family that in humans is encoded by the CARD10 gene.

== Function ==
The caspase recruitment domain (CARD) is a protein module that consists of 6 or 7 antiparallel alpha helices. It participates in signaling through highly specific protein-protein homophilic interactions. CARDs induce nuclear factor kappa-B (NF-κB; MIM 164011) activity through the IKK (e.g., IKBKB; MIM 603258) complex. CARD9 (MIM 607212), CARD10, CARD11 (MIM 607210), and CARD14 (MIM 607211) interact with BCL10 (MIM 603517) and are involved in NF-κB signaling complexes. Except for CARD9, these CARD proteins are members of the membrane-associated guanylate kinase (MAGUK) family.[supplied by OMIM]

== Interactions ==
CARD10 has been shown to interact with BCL10.
