= Deep dermatophytosis =

- Other names: Disseminated granulomatous dermatophytosis
- Specialty: Dermatology

Deep dermatophytosis is a rare condition in which dermatophytes invades the deep dermis, subcutis or even internal organs. The known causes of this condition are caused by primary or secondary immunodeficiency, which includes organ transplant recipients, malignant conditions e.g. leukemia, HIV infection. It is also associated with asthma, atopic dermatitis and diabetes.

It has been shown that deficiency in the NF-κB signaling pathways, the nonsense mutation of CARD9-complex (caspase recruitment domain-containing protein 9), are susceptible to chronic fungal infection and deep dermatophytosis.
