= ZC3H12B =

Protein-coding gene in the species Homo sapiens

Identifiers
- Aliases: ZC3H12B, CXorf32, MCPIP2, zinc finger CCCH-type containing 12B
- External IDs: OMIM: 300889; MGI: 2442133; GeneCards: ZC3H12B

Gene location (Human)
Chr.	X chromosome (human)
Band	Xq11.2-q12	Start	65,366,638 bp
Band	Xq11.2-q12	End	65,507,887 bp

Gene location (Mouse)
Chr.	X chromosome (mouse)
Band	X|X C3	Start	94,755,284 bp
Band	X|X C3	End	94,976,243 bp
RNA expression pattern
Bgee	Human / Mouse (ortholog); Top expressed in: prefrontal cortex; gonad; Brodmann area 23; superior frontal gyrus; primary visual cortex; postcentral gyrus; dorsolateral prefrontal cortex; middle temporal gyrus; entorhinal cortex; Achilles tendon / Top expressed in: dentate gyrus of hippocampal formation granule cell; hippocampus proper; primary visual cortex; Cortex of frontal lobe; cerebellar cortex; superior frontal gyrus; genital tubercle; zygote; tail of embryo; primary oocyte; More reference expression data
BioGPS	n/a
Orthologs
Databases	NCBI: entry; OMA: entry
Species	Human	Mouse
Entrez	340554	547176
Ensembl	ENSG00000102053	ENSMUSG00000035045
UniProt	Q5HYM0	n/a
RefSeq (mRNA)	NM_001010888	NM_001034907
RefSeq (protein)	NP_001010888	n/a
Location (UCSC)	Chr X: 65.37 – 65.51 Mb	Chr X: 94.76 – 94.98 Mb
PubMed search
- Wikidata
View/Edit Human	View/Edit Mouse

ZC3H12B, also known as CXorf32 or MCPIP2, is a protein encoded by gene ZC3H12B located on chromosome Xq12 in humans.

== Gene ==
The ZC3H12B gene is composed of 19,709 base pairs (bp) and contains 5 exons. It is located on the X chromosome at q12 on the plus strand.

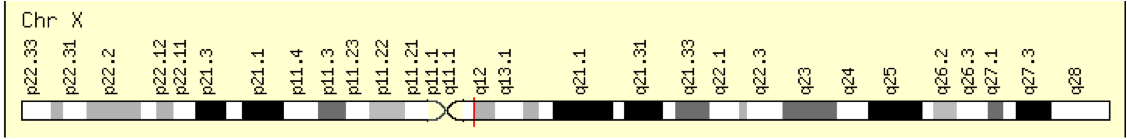
ZC3H12B Locus.

ZC3H12B contains a ribonuclease domain, as well as a CCCH-type zinc finger domain. Ribonucleases (RNases) degrade RNA and are involved in the RNA maturation process. They are also a line of defense against viral RNA (D'Alessio and Riordan 1997). CCCH-type zinc fingers are associated with mRNA destabilization. CCCH-type zinc fingers have been shown to turn over mRNA without the removal of the PolyA tail (Lai and Blackshear 2001). ZC3H12B and its paralogs ZC3H12A, ZC3H12C and ZC3H12D all contain CCCH-type zinc finger domains, which have been associated with cell cycle and growth phase transitions in eukaryotes (InterPro).

=== Promoter ===
Genomatix ElDorado program predicted a 601 bp promoter upstream of the ZC3H12B gene with multiple transcription factor binding sites including nuclear factor of activated T-cells and ribonucleoprotein associated zinc finger protein MOK-2 (also known as ZNF239).

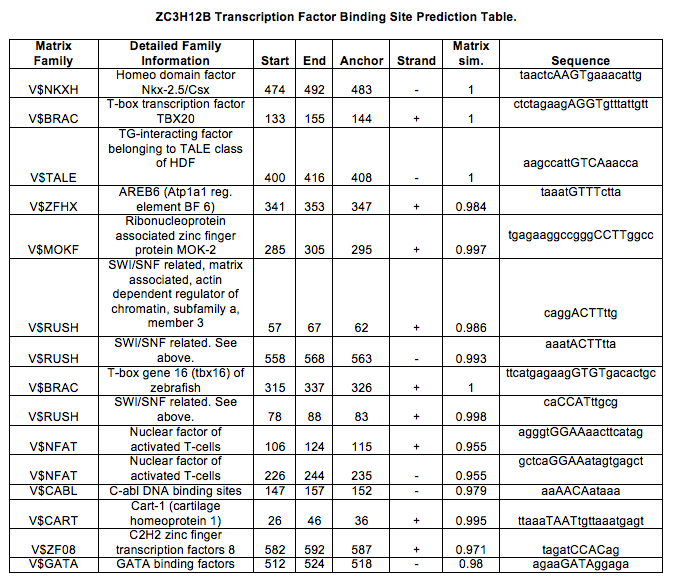
Transcription factor binding site predictions in the promoter of ZC3H12B.

== mRNA ==
ZC3H12B contains 7273 bp mRNA. There is only one predicted transcript by Aceview. No folding patterns have been predicted (Mfold). There are for introns excised from ZC3H12B.

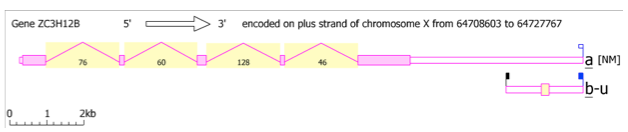
Aceview single-predicted mRNA variant in ZC3H12B.

== Protein ==
ZC3H12B is a probable ribonuclease containing CCCH-type zinc finger domain and ribonuclease domains. The 836 amino acid protein has a predicted molecular weight of 94.2 kdal. It does not contain a signal peptide or a transmembrane region. PSORTII predicted 65.2% probability of nuclear location. CCCH-type zinc fingers and ribonucleases are presumably located in the nucleus for RNA cleaving and specifically, RNA hairpin cleaving (Boysen and Hearn 2008).

=== Structural characteristics ===
The protein secondary structure is a mixture of alpha helices and beta strands. The two domains identified so far are the ribonuclease and CCCH-type zinc finger domains.

Shown below is a conserved domain of ZC3H12B paralog, Mcpip1 (or ZC3H12A). In a BLAST structure comparison, there was an 82% identity match with 24% query coverage, with a predicted e-value of 2e-118. 82% identity match is enough to make comparisons of ZC3H12B and Mcpip1 (ZC3H12A) zinc finger conserved domain, which are both predicted to be composed of beta strands and alpha helices.

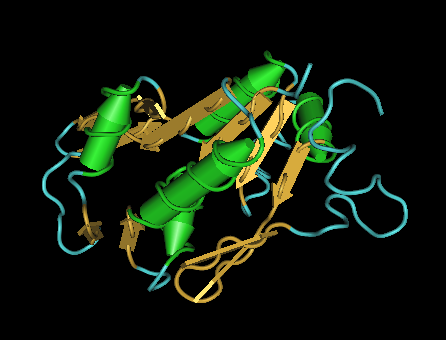
Cn3D rendering of Mcpip1 conserved domain with zinc-finger motif.

=== Post-translational modification ===
Phobius program predicted non-cytoplasmic protein location. NetPhos 2.0. predicted 63 phosphorylation sites in ZC3H12B, which are marked on the conceptual translation. YinOYang1.2. predicted three 0-Beta-GlcNAc attachment sites, which are competing with phosphorylation sites. 0-Beta-GlcNAc is presumably the only type of glycosylation occurring in the nucleus and/or cytoplasm of cells. There is a notable link between antigen activation by lymphocytes and dynamic 0-B-Glycosylation in nuclear proteins (Hart and Akimoto). NetNGlyc predicted glycosylation sites; however, these sites were excluded because the protein is likely nuclear and would not undergo this form of glycosylation. There were no predicted acetylation sites at the N-terminus of the protein. This is unusual because approximately 85% of human proteins are acetylated at the N terminus for synthesis, stabilization and localization of proteins (Van Damm et al.). No positive, negative or mixed charge clusters present. No hydrophobic segments detected (SAPS SDSC Biology Workbench). MitoProtII did not detect any mitochondria export signals. These post-translational tests suggest the protein is located in the nucleus and undergoes dynamic phosphorylation and 0-Beta-GlcNAc modifications.

== Evolution ==
Select domains of ZC3H12B are conserved in most vertebrates, arthropods and annelids. There are not conserved domains in domains bacteria or archaea. There were not significantly conserved domains in yeasts, plants or protists.

=== Paralogs ===
There are three paralogs of ZC3H12B which are in the same CCCH-type zinc finger family, all which maintain greater than 50% identity to ZC3H12B based on BLAST analysis (NCBI).

Name	Species	NCBI accession number	Length (AA)	Protein identity
ZC3H12B	Homo sapiens	NM_001010888.3	836aa	100%
ZC3H12A	Homo sapiens	NM_025079.2	599aa	68%
ZC3H12C	Homo sapiens	NM_033390.1	883aa	53%
ZC3H12D	Homo sapiens	NM_207360.2	527aa	61%

=== Orthologs ===
ZC3H12B is conserved in mammals, birds, insects and nematodes (BLAST). See the table below for the summary of orthologs of ZC3H12B in humans.

Species	Species common name	Divergence (MYA)	NCBI accession number (protein)	Length (amino acids)	Protein identity	Similarity
Homo sapiens	Human	n/a	NP_001010888.3	836aa	100%	100%
Pan paniscus	Chimpanzee	6.3	XP_003816967.1	836aa	99%	99%
Pongo abelii	Orangutan	15.7	XP_002831786.1	836aa	99%	99%
Macaca mulatta	Rhesus monkey	29	XP_002806307.1	836aa	99%	99%
Callithrix jacchus	Marmoset	42.6	XP_002762992.2	836aa	98%	98%
Mus musculus	Mouse	92.3	NP_001030079.2	835aa	91%	94%
Sus scrofa	Pig	94.2	XP_003360389.1	836aa	93%	96%
Gallus gallus	Chicken	296	XP_003641177.1	837aa	77%	85%
Chrysemys picta bellii	Painted turtle	296	XP_005279572.1	838aa	78%	86%
Oryzias latipes	Medaka	400.1	XP_004076599.1	845aa	67%	77%
Gadus morhua	Atlantic cod	400.1	AFK76491.1	842aa	29%	44%
Danio rerio	Zebrafish	400.1	XP_001342172.3	982aa	68%	77%
Petromyzon marinus	Lamprey	535.7	ABO21295.1	222aa	44%	58%
Branchiostoma floridae	Lancelet	713.2	XP_002598834.1	492aa	66%	79%
Ciona intestinalis	Vase tunicate	722.5	XP_002125834.1	863aa	54%	66%
Strongylocentrotus purpuratus	Purple sea urchin	742.9	XP_787030.3	974aa	58%	72%
Aplysiomorpha californica	Sea hare	782.7	XP_005113312.1	1269aa	51%	69%
Drosophila grimshawi	Hawaii fruit fly	782.7	XP_001994140.1	548aa	51%	69%
Anopheles gambiae	Mosquito	782.7	XP_321880	637aa	59%	75%
Apis mellifera	Honey bee	782.7	XP_397264	652aa	58%	73%
Caenorhabditis elegans	Round worm (nematode)	937.5	NP_491985.4	634aa	46%	64%

== Expression and function ==
Microarrays in normal tissue expression profiling showed increased expression of the gene in the pancreas, prostate, brain, spinal cord and thymus (GEO). Unlike its paralogs, it is not expressed in macrophage-activated tissues, which indicates the paralogous relationship to the inflammatory response (Liang et al. 2008). ZC3H12B is expressed transiently in brain, thymus and testis tissues (EST).

== Interaction ==
Predicted interactions by Ingenuity Systems showed no drug targeting molecules in pathway and no known drug targets. The listed top functions and diseases were cancer, organismal injury and abnormalities, reproductive system disease. Several miRNA interactions were predicted. The predicted miRNA targets have yet to be matched to the ZC3H12B sequence and it is unclear whether there is an interaction between the two. Tests such as Forster Resonance Energy Transfer (FRET), co-immunoprecipitation, two-hybrid screening, hydropathic complementarity, cluster-microarray and ChiP could be used in the future to test for new protein/chromatin interactions with ZC3H12B.

== Clinical significance ==
Deletions of the Xq12 locus has resulted in several disorders such as androgen insensitivity, susceptibility to prostate cancer, spinal and bulbar muscular atrophy of Kennedy and mental retardation; however, no link has been found between these diseases and ZC3H12B (NCBI).
