= BCL10 =

Protein-coding gene in humans

Identifiers
- Aliases: BCL10, CARMEN, CIPER, CLAP, c-E10, mE10, IMD37, B-cell CLL/lymphoma 10, B cell CLL/lymphoma 10, immune signaling adaptor, BCL10 immune signaling adaptor
- External IDs: OMIM: 603517; MGI: 1337994; GeneCards: BCL10
Available structures
PDB	Ortholog search: PDBe RCSB
PDB	List of PDB id codes 2MB9

Gene location (Human)
Chr.	Chromosome 1 (human)
Band	1p22.3	Start	85,265,776 bp
Band	1p22.3	End	85,276,632 bp

Gene location (Mouse)
Chr.	Chromosome 3 (mouse)
Band	3|3 H2	Start	145,628,559 bp
Band	3|3 H2	End	145,640,111 bp
RNA expression pattern
Bgee	Human / Mouse (ortholog); Top expressed in: mucosa of sigmoid colon; oocyte; gingival epithelium; secondary oocyte; epithelium of nasopharynx; palpebral conjunctiva; germinal epithelium; amniotic fluid; tibia; jejunal mucosa / Top expressed in: saccule; otic placode; granulocyte; Paneth cell; otic vesicle; stroma of bone marrow; cumulus cell; Ileal epithelium; blood; renal corpuscle; More reference expression data
BioGPS	n/a
Gene ontology
Molecular function	transcription coactivator activity; transcription factor binding; protein kinase B binding; NF-kappaB binding; protease binding; protein self-association; kinase binding; protein C-terminus binding; protein binding; kinase activator activity; enzyme binding; protein kinase binding; ubiquitin protein ligase binding; identical protein binding; CARD domain binding
Cellular component	cytoplasm; cytosol; membrane; T cell receptor complex; lipopolysaccharide receptor complex; immunological synapse; perinuclear region of cytoplasm; membrane raft; cytoplasmic microtubule; lysosome; nucleus; CBM complex; protein-containing complex
Biological process	apoptotic process; T cell apoptotic process; regulation of apoptotic process; adaptive immune response; B cell apoptotic process; regulation of T cell receptor signaling pathway; immune system process; cell death; stimulatory C-type lectin receptor signaling pathway; negative regulation of mature B cell apoptotic process; toll-like receptor signaling pathway; positive regulation of transcription, DNA-templated; Fc-epsilon receptor signaling pathway; cellular defense response; positive regulation of cysteine-type endopeptidase activity involved in apoptotic process; cellular response to mechanical stimulus; neural tube closure; response to fungus; positive regulation of T cell activation; positive regulation of NF-kappaB transcription factor activity; immunoglobulin mediated immune response; protein complex oligomerization; positive regulation of mast cell cytokine production; response to food; positive regulation of I-kappaB kinase/NF-kappaB signaling; positive regulation of extrinsic apoptotic signaling pathway; positive regulation of phosphorylation; response to molecule of bacterial origin; I-kappaB kinase/NF-kappaB signaling; positive regulation of protein ubiquitination; T cell receptor signaling pathway; protein homooligomerization; innate immune response; protein ubiquitination; positive regulation of apoptotic process; protein heterooligomerization; lipopolysaccharide-mediated signaling pathway; positive regulation of kinase activity
Sources:Amigo / QuickGO
Orthologs
Databases	NCBI: entry; OMA: entry
Species	Human	Mouse
Entrez	8915	12042
Ensembl	ENSG00000142867	ENSMUSG00000028191
UniProt	O95999	Q9Z0H7
RefSeq (mRNA)	NM_003921; NM_001320715	NM_009740
RefSeq (protein)	NP_001307644; NP_003912; NP_001307644.1	NP_033870
Location (UCSC)	Chr 1: 85.27 – 85.28 Mb	Chr 3: 145.63 – 145.64 Mb
PubMed search
- Wikidata
View/Edit Human	View/Edit Mouse

B-cell lymphoma/leukemia 10 is a protein that in humans is encoded by the BCL10 gene. Like BCL2, BCL3, BCL5, BCL6, BCL7A, and BCL9, it has clinical significance in lymphoma.

== Function ==
BCL10 was identified by its translocation in a case of mucosa-associated lymphoid tissue (MALT) lymphoma. The protein encoded by this gene contains a caspase recruitment domain (CARD), and has been shown to activate NF-κB. This protein is reported to interact with other CARD and coiled coil domain containing proteins including CARD9, -10, -11 and -14, which are thought to function as upstream regulators in NF-κB signaling. This protein is found to form a complex with the paracaspase MALT1, a protein encoded by another gene known to be translocated in MALT lymphoma. MALT1 and BCL10 thought to synergize in the activation of NF-κB, and the deregulation of either of them may contribute to the same pathogenetic process that leads to the malignancy. BCL10 is evolutionary conserved since cnidaria and has been shown to be functionally conserved all the way back to zebrafish. Notably, just like the upstream CARD-CC family, BCL10 is absent in insects and nematodes, and the correlated phylogenetic distribution of BCL10 and CARD-CC proteins indicate a conserved complex.

== Interactions ==
BCL10 has been shown to interact with these proteins:

- CARD10,
- CARD11,
- CARD14,
- CARD9
- CRADD,
- IKBKG,
- MALT1, and
- TRAF2.
