= SORBS3 =

Protein-coding gene in the species Homo sapiens

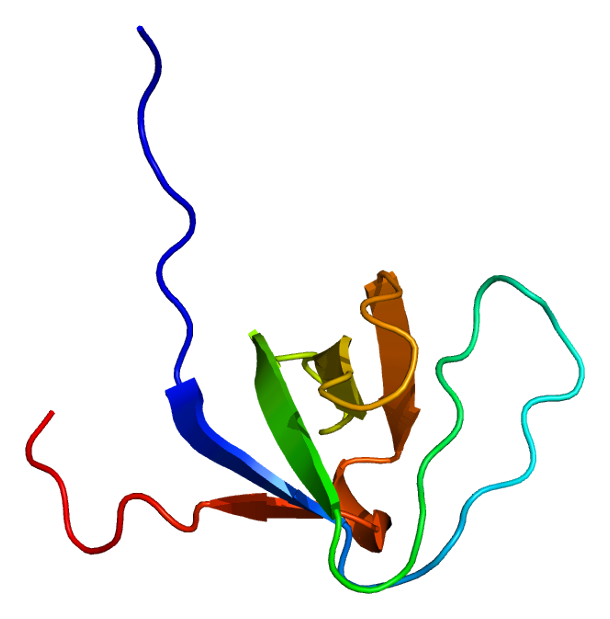

Identifiers
- Aliases: SORBS3, SCAM-1, SCAM1, SH3D4, sorbin and SH3 domain containing 3
- External IDs: OMIM: 610795; MGI: 700013; GeneCards: SORBS3
Available structures
PDB	Ortholog search: PDBe RCSB
PDB	List of PDB id codes 2CT3, 2DLM, 2NWM, 2YUP

Gene location (Human)
Chr.	Chromosome 8 (human)
Band	8p21.3	Start	22,544,986 bp
Band	8p21.3	End	22,575,788 bp

Gene location (Mouse)
Chr.	Chromosome 14 (mouse)
Band	14 D2|14 36.27 cM	Start	70,417,917 bp
Band	14 D2|14 36.27 cM	End	70,449,438 bp
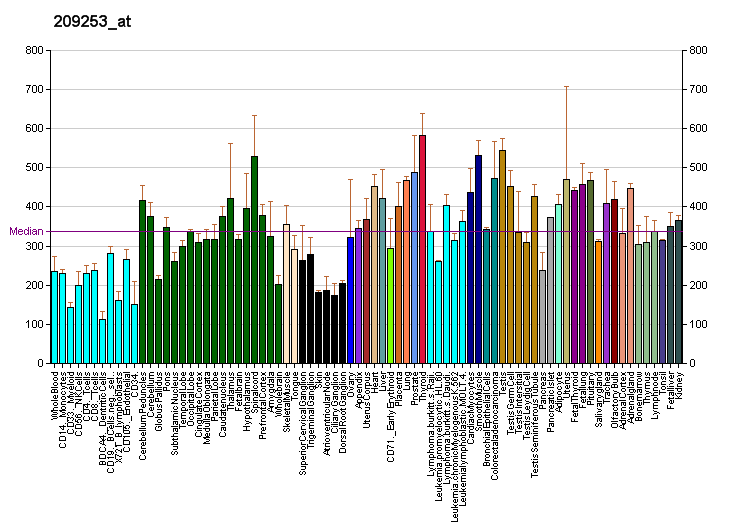

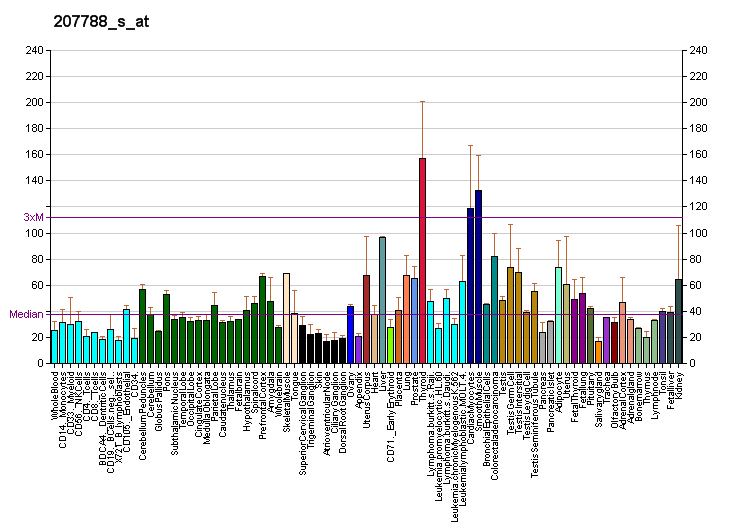
RNA expression pattern
Bgee	Human / Mouse (ortholog); Top expressed in: right testis; left testis; right coronary artery; popliteal artery; tibial arteries; tibial nerve; gastric mucosa; left coronary artery; canal of the cervix; ascending aorta / Top expressed in: external carotid artery; muscle of thigh; internal carotid artery; genital tubercle; retinal pigment epithelium; vestibular membrane of cochlear duct; ankle; right lung; right lung lobe; choroid plexus of fourth ventricle; More reference expression data
BioGPS	More reference expression data
Gene ontology
Molecular function	vinculin binding; transcription factor binding; structural constituent of cytoskeleton; protein binding
Cellular component	cytoplasm; cytosol; cell junction; cytoskeleton; nucleus; focal adhesion
Biological process	cell-substrate adhesion; cell adhesion; muscle contraction; negative regulation of transcription by RNA polymerase II; positive regulation of stress fiber assembly; positive regulation of cytoskeleton organization; positive regulation of MAPK cascade; actin filament organization
Sources:Amigo / QuickGO
Orthologs
Databases	NCBI: entry; OMA: entry
Species	Human	Mouse
Entrez	10174	20410
Ensembl	ENSG00000120896	ENSMUSG00000022091
UniProt	O60504	Q9R1Z8
RefSeq (mRNA)	NM_001018003; NM_005775	NM_001271407; NM_001271408; NM_001271409; NM_011366
RefSeq (protein)	NP_001018003; NP_005766	NP_001258336; NP_001258337; NP_001258338; NP_035496
Location (UCSC)	Chr 8: 22.54 – 22.58 Mb	Chr 14: 70.42 – 70.45 Mb
PubMed search
- Wikidata
View/Edit Human	View/Edit Mouse

Vinexin is a protein that in humans is encoded by the SORBS3 gene.

== Interactions ==
SORBS3 has been shown to interact with DLG5 and MAPK1.
