= CARD11 =

Protein-coding gene in humans

Identifiers
- Aliases: CARD11, BENTA, BIMP3, CARMA1, IMD11, PPBL, caspase recruitment domain family member 11, IMD11A
- External IDs: OMIM: 607210; MGI: 1916978; GeneCards: CARD11
Available structures
PDB	Ortholog search: PDBe RCSB
PDB	List of PDB id codes 4JUP, 4LWD

Gene location (Human)
Chr.	Chromosome 7 (human)
Band	7p22.2	Start	2,906,142 bp
Band	7p22.2	End	3,043,867 bp

Gene location (Mouse)
Chr.	Chromosome 5 (mouse)
Band	5|5 G2	Start	140,858,745 bp
Band	5|5 G2	End	140,986,337 bp
RNA expression pattern
Bgee	Human / Mouse (ortholog); Top expressed in: granulocyte; lymph node; spleen; appendix; blood; superficial temporal artery; parotid gland; palpebral conjunctiva; amniotic fluid; gallbladder / Top expressed in: mesenteric lymph nodes; spleen; thymus; blood; ciliary body; Paneth cell; embryo; subcutaneous adipose tissue; duodenum; embryo; More reference expression data
BioGPS	n/a
Gene ontology
Molecular function	guanylate kinase activity; protein binding; CARD domain binding
Cellular component	cytoplasm; cytosol; membrane; T cell receptor complex; immunological synapse; membrane raft; extracellular exosome; plasma membrane; CBM complex
Biological process	regulation of apoptotic process; positive regulation of cytokine production; T cell costimulation; stimulatory C-type lectin receptor signaling pathway; Fc-epsilon receptor signaling pathway; positive regulation of T cell activation; positive regulation of B cell proliferation; positive regulation of T cell proliferation; regulation of immune response; positive regulation of I-kappaB kinase/NF-kappaB signaling; T cell receptor signaling pathway; regulation of B cell differentiation; thymic T cell selection; regulation of T cell differentiation; signal transduction; GMP metabolic process; positive regulation of NF-kappaB transcription factor activity; GDP metabolic process; immunoglobulin production; B cell differentiation; B cell proliferation; T cell activation; lymphocyte activation; homeostasis of number of cells; I-kappaB kinase/NF-kappaB signaling; TORC1 signaling
Sources:Amigo / QuickGO
Orthologs
Databases	NCBI: entry; OMA: entry
Species	Human	Mouse
Entrez	84433	108723
Ensembl	ENSG00000198286	ENSMUSG00000036526
UniProt	Q9BXL7	Q8CIS0
RefSeq (mRNA)	NM_032415; NM_001324281	NM_175362
RefSeq (protein)	NP_001311210; NP_115791	NP_780571
Location (UCSC)	Chr 7: 2.91 – 3.04 Mb	Chr 5: 140.86 – 140.99 Mb
PubMed search
- Wikidata
View/Edit Human	View/Edit Mouse

Caspase recruitment domain-containing protein 11 also known as CARD-containing MAGUK protein 1 (Carma 1) is a protein in the CARD-CC protein family that in humans is encoded by the CARD11 gene. CARD 11 is a membrane associated protein that is found in various human tissues, including the thymus, spleen, liver, and peripheral blood leukocytes. Similarly, CARD 11 is also found in abundance in various lines of cancer cells.

== Function ==
The protein encoded by this gene belongs to the membrane-associated guanylate kinase (MAGUK) family, a class of proteins that functions as molecular scaffolds for the assembly of multiprotein complexes at specialized regions of the plasma membrane. This protein is also a member of the CARD protein family, which is defined by carrying a characteristic caspase-associated recruitment domain (CARD). CARD11 (CARMA1) has a domain structure similar to that of CARD10 (CARMA3) and CARD14 (CARMA2) as a member of the CARD-CC family with a C terminal MAGUK domain (the so-called CARMA proteins). The CARD domain of proteins in the CARD-CC family have been shown to specifically interact with BCL10, a protein known to function as a positive regulator of NF-κB activation by recruitment and activation of MALT1. When overexpressed in cells, this protein family activates NF-κB and induces the phosphorylation of BCL10.

CARD11 is critical for T cell and B cell function and is activated after T cell receptor or B cell receptor stimulation. After receptor stimulation, CARD11 is phosphorylated by PKC-θ (in T cells) or PKC-β (in B cells). The phosphorylation induces formation of filamentous CARD11 multimers that recruit BCL10 and MALT1, which in turn activates NF-κB. Loss of function mutations in CARD11 cause severe combined immunodeficiency (SCID) since the function of cells critical for adaptive immunity are disrupted.

== Structure ==
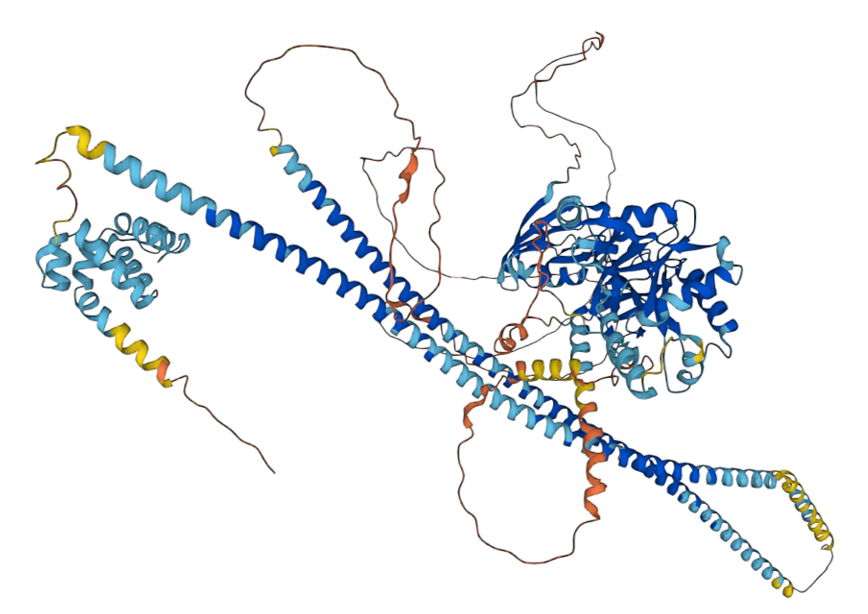
This is the predicted structure of CARD11 produced by AlphaFold. The different colored regions reflect the confidence that a particular residue is in that location, with dark blue being the most confident and orange indicating the least confidence.

The structure of CARD11 involves multiple domains that impact the protein's ability to activate BCL10 and NF-κB activity. CARD11 has a CARD domain, a serine-threonine rich region, is associated with the N-terminus, which is essential for NF-κB signaling activity. The region following the CARD domain is highly coiled. In deleting the CARD domain, all NF-κB signaling activity was prevented. The CARD domain on CARD11 interacts with the CARD domain on BCL10 to initiate the signaling pathway.

On the C-terminus of CARD11 there is the MAGUK domain that is associated with the cell membrane. This domain is often referred to as the inhibitory domain. Protein kinase C activates CARD11 by phosphorylating serine residues within the inhibitory domain.

== Interactions ==
CARD11 has been shown to interact with BCL10. This interaction occurs between the CARD domain on BCL10 and the CARD domain on CARD11, and results in signal propagation and NF-κB activation.
