= Metacaspase =

Class of enzymes

Metacaspases are members of the C14 class of cysteine proteases and thus related to caspases, orthocaspases and paracaspases. The metacaspases are arginine/lysine-specific, in contrast to caspases, which are aspartate-specific.

== Structure and Phylogenetic distribution ==
=== Prokaryotes ===
In archea and bacteria, there are several metacaspases with a wide range of domain organizations. Based on the prokaryote metacaspase diversity, orthocaspases can be considered a sub-class of metacaspases. Common for both metacaspases and orthocaspases classes is their specificity for basic residues (arginine or lysine) in the P1 position. At this moment, no structural variants have been reported where the substrate specificity would change to an acidic residue (aspartic acid), like in true caspases.

=== Eukaryotes ===
Metacaspases are found in plants, fungi, and "protists", but not in slime mold or animals.

=== Viruses ===
Viral metacaspases, which may have implications in rewiring host metabolism to enhance infection, are widespread in the ocean.

==== Type I ====
Type I metacaspases are characterized by an amino-terminal proline or glutamine rich LSD zinc finger-like domain. This type can be found in prokaryotes and eukaryotes other than animals.

==== Type II ====
Type II is found only in certain green algae and land plants, with one recent exception where both type I and type II metacaspases were found in the genome of Monosiga brevicollis (Choanoflagellate), possibly as a result of an unusual horizontal gene transfer between two eukaryotes.This group is characterized by long linker region and the absence of an amino-terminal pro-domain.

== Known functions ==
In an analogous manner to caspases, metacaspases induce programmed cell death in both plants and fungi (yeast).

== See also ==
- The Proteolysis Map
- MALT1
