= Pecazine =

Chemical compound

Mepazine INN: Pecazine

Clinical data
- Trade names: Pacatal, Pacatol, Paxital, Lacumin, Nothiazine
- Routes of administration: Oral, parenteral
- ATC code: None

Legal status
- Legal status: BR: Class C1 (Other controlled substances); US: ℞-only (withdrawn, 21 CFR 216.24)

Identifiers
- IUPAC name: 10-[(1-methylpiperidin-3-yl)methyl]phenothiazine
- CAS Number: 60-89-9 2975-36-2 (HCl)
- PubChem CID: 6075
- IUPHAR/BPS: 9782
- ChemSpider: 5850
- UNII: PH34873A38
- KEGG: D02607
- ChEBI: CHEBI:135324
- ChEMBL: ChEMBL395110
- CompTox Dashboard (EPA): DTXSID2046177
- ECHA InfoCard: 100.000.446

Chemical and physical data
- Formula: C_{19}H_{22}N_{2}S
- Molar mass: 310.46 g·mol^{−1}
- 3D model (JSmol): Interactive image
- SMILES: CN1CCCC(C1)CN2C3=CC=CC=C3SC4=CC=CC=C42
- InChI: InChI=1S/C19H22N2S/c1-20-12-6-7-15(13-20)14-21-16-8-2-4-10-18(16)22-19-11-5-3-9-17(19)21/h2-5,8-11,15H,6-7,12-14H2,1H3; Key:CBHCDHNUZWWAPP-UHFFFAOYSA-N

Pecazine (INN), also known as mepazine (trade name Pacatal), is a phenothiazine formerly used as a neuroleptic drug or major tranquilizer.

Pecazine was first synthesized in 1953 by Wilhelm Schuler and Otto Nieschulz and was quickly incorporated into psychiatric practice as an ataractic, i.e., a true tranquilizer rather than a hypnotic or depressant. It was considered interchangeable with chlorpromazine, albeit with a different side effect profile, which included less sedation and a lower risk of extrapyramidal symptoms due to its potent parasympatholytic and anticholinergic effect.

As early as 1958, however, studies reported inferiority to other phenothiazines in the treatment of schizophrenia and questioned its place in the clinic; in 1960, a double-blind, randomized controlled trial found pecazine to be no more effective than placebo. Subsequent research found that, like the structurally related promethazine, pecazine is essentially devoid of antipsychotic activity.

Pecazine was implicated in a number of cases of agranulocytosis and was subsequently withdrawn from the market. More recently, it has become a subject of research interest as a MALT1 and RANKL inhibitor.
