= Lymphocytosis =

Excess lymphocytes in the blood

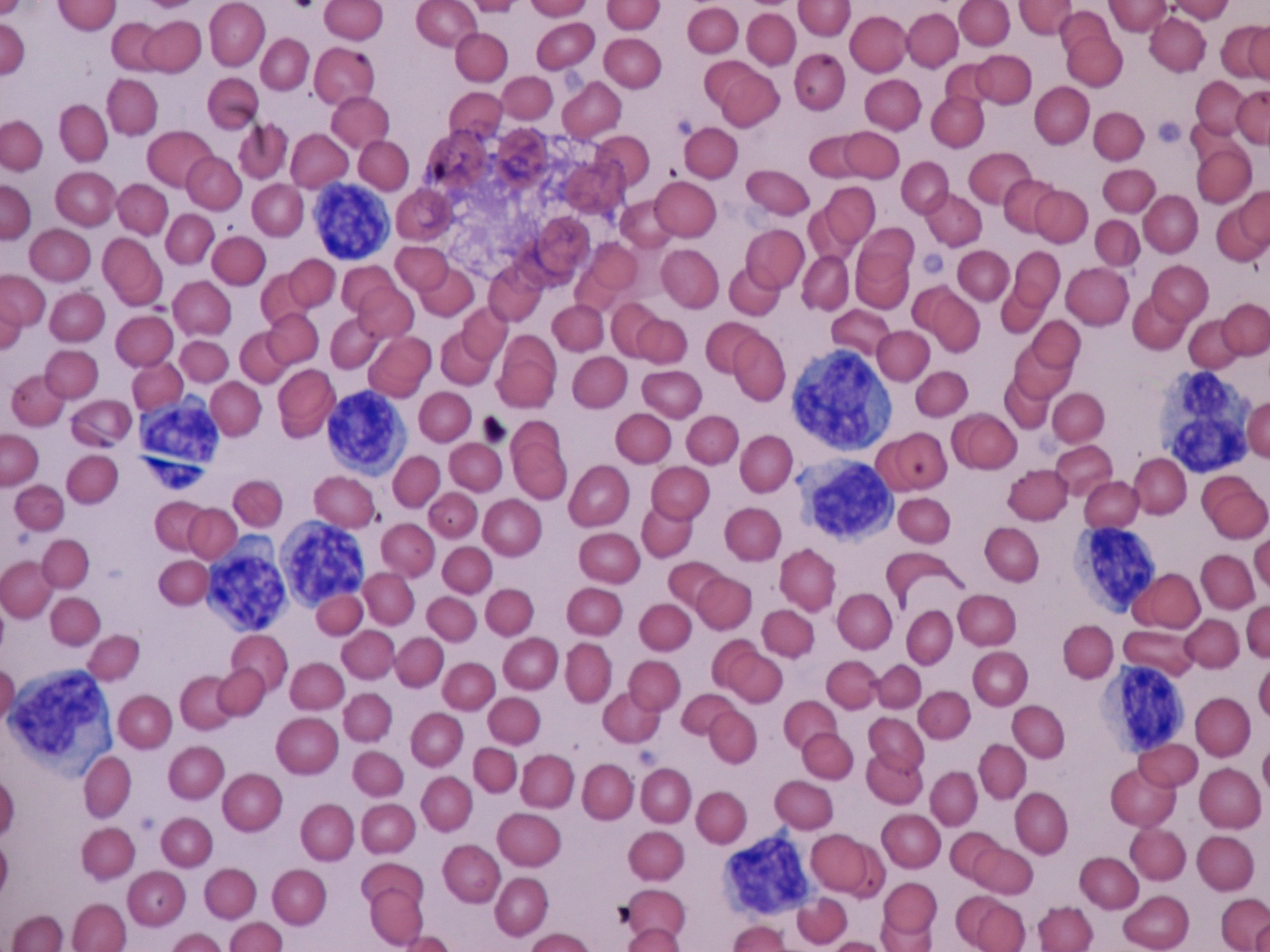
- Lymphocytosis, peripheral blood smear (40x)
- Specialty: Hematology

Lymphocytosis is an increase in the number or proportion of lymphocytes in the blood. Absolute lymphocytosis is the condition where there is an increase in the lymphocyte count beyond the normal range while relative lymphocytosis refers to the condition where the proportion of lymphocytes relative to white blood cell count is above the normal range. In adults, absolute lymphocytosis is present when the lymphocyte count is greater than 5000 per microliter (5.0 billion/L), in older children greater than 7000 per microliter and in infants greater than 9000 per microliter. Lymphocytes normally represent 20% to 40% of circulating white blood cells. When the percentage of lymphocytes exceeds 40%, it is recognized as relative lymphocytosis.

== Causes ==
Lymphocytosis is a feature of infection, particularly in children. In the elderly, lymphoproliferative disorders, including chronic lymphocytic leukemia and lymphomas, often present with lymphadenopathy and a lymphocytosis.

Causes of absolute lymphocytosis include:

- acute viral infections, such as infectious mononucleosis (glandular fever), hepatitis and cytomegalovirus infection
- other acute infections such as pertussis
- some protozoal infections, such as toxoplasmosis and American trypanosomiasis (Chagas disease)
- chronic intracellular bacterial infections such as tuberculosis or brucellosis
- chronic lymphocytic leukemia
- acute lymphoblastic leukemia
- lymphoma
- post-splenectomy state
- CARD11-related congenital B cell lymphocytosis (rare, also known as BENTA disease)

Causes of relative lymphocytosis include:

- age less than 2 years;
- acute viral infections;
- connective tissue diseases,
- thyrotoxicosis,
- Addison's disease,
- splenomegaly with splenic sequestration of granulocytes.

== Diagnosis ==
Lymphocytosis is usually detected when a complete blood count is obtained. If not provided the lymphocyte count can be calculated by multiplying the total white blood cell (WBC) count by the percentage of lymphocytes found in the differential count. The lymphocyte count can also be directly measured by flow cytometry.

== See also ==
- Lymphocytopenia
