= RC3H1 =

Protein-coding gene in humans

Identifiers
- Aliases: RC3H1, RNF198, ROQUIN, ring finger and CCCH-type domains 1, FHL6, IMDSHY
- External IDs: OMIM: 609424; MGI: 2685397; GeneCards: RC3H1
Available structures
PDB	Ortholog search: PDBe RCSB
PDB	List of PDB id codes 3X1O, 4QIK, 4QIL, 4ULW, 4YWQ
Enzyme activity
EC #	BRENDA	ExPASy	KEGG	MetaCyc
2.3.2.27	↗	↗	↗	↗

Gene location (Human)
Chr.	Chromosome 1 (human)
Band	1q25.1	Start	173,931,084 bp
Band	1q25.1	End	174,022,357 bp

Gene location (Mouse)
Chr.	Chromosome 1 (mouse)
Band	1|1 H2.1	Start	160,733,988 bp
Band	1|1 H2.1	End	160,802,548 bp
RNA expression pattern
Bgee	Human / Mouse (ortholog); Top expressed in: tibialis anterior muscle; skin of thigh; mucosa of ileum; deltoid muscle; buccal mucosa cell; skin of hip; skin of arm; pancreatic epithelial cell; cardiac muscle tissue of right atrium; trabecular bone / Top expressed in: hand; aortic valve; ascending aorta; otolith organ; utricle; fossa; condyle; facial motor nucleus; Paneth cell; conjunctival fornix; More reference expression data
BioGPS	n/a
Gene ontology
Molecular function	ubiquitin protein ligase activity; metal ion binding; mRNA binding; RNA stem-loop binding; mRNA 3'-UTR binding; RNA binding; double-stranded RNA binding; ubiquitin-protein transferase activity; protein binding; zinc ion binding; transferase activity; miRNA binding
Cellular component	cytoplasm; P-body; cytoplasmic stress granule
Biological process	regulation of T cell proliferation; regulation of T cell activation; B cell homeostasis; spleen development; positive regulation of NIK/NF-kappaB signaling; T cell homeostasis; T cell proliferation; regulation of gene expression; lymph node development; T follicular helper cell differentiation; negative regulation of T-helper cell differentiation; regulation of mRNA stability; positive regulation of mRNA catabolic process; regulation of germinal center formation; posttranscriptional regulation of gene expression; negative regulation of germinal center formation; negative regulation of B cell proliferation; cellular response to interleukin-1; protein ubiquitination; nuclear-transcribed mRNA catabolic process, deadenylation-dependent decay; P-body assembly; regulation of T cell receptor signaling pathway; nuclear-transcribed mRNA catabolic process; negative regulation of activated T cell proliferation; 3'-UTR-mediated mRNA destabilization; protein polyubiquitination; T cell receptor signaling pathway; negative regulation of T-helper 17 cell differentiation; regulation of miRNA metabolic process
Sources:Amigo / QuickGO
Orthologs
Databases	NCBI: entry; OMA: entry
Species	Human	Mouse
Entrez	149041	381305
Ensembl	ENSG00000135870	ENSMUSG00000040423
UniProt	Q5TC82	Q4VGL6
RefSeq (mRNA)	NM_001300850; NM_001300851; NM_001300852; NM_172071	NM_001024952
RefSeq (protein)	NP_001287779; NP_001287780; NP_001287781; NP_742068; NP_001287779.1	NP_001020123
Location (UCSC)	Chr 1: 173.93 – 174.02 Mb	Chr 1: 160.73 – 160.8 Mb
PubMed search
- Wikidata
View/Edit Human	View/Edit Mouse

Ring finger and CCCH-type domains 1, also known as Roquin-1, is a protein that in humans is encoded by the RC3H1 gene.

== Function ==
The consensus primary sequence and secondary structure for the Roquin-1 (RC3H1) binding site (also called constitutive decay element (CDE))

This gene encodes a protein containing RING-type and C3H1-type zinc finger motifs. The encoded protein recognizes and binds to a constitutive decay element (CDE) in the 3' UTR of mRNAs, leading to mRNA deadenylation and degradation. Alternative splicing results in multiple transcript variants. [provided by RefSeq, Jul 2014].
