= ZC3H12A =

Protein-coding gene in humans

Identifiers
- Aliases: ZC3H12A, MCPIP, MCPIP1, dJ423B22.1, zinc finger CCCH-type containing 12A, Reg1, MCPIP-1
- External IDs: OMIM: 610562; MGI: 2385891; GeneCards: ZC3H12A
Available structures
PDB	Ortholog search: PDBe RCSB
PDB	List of PDB id codes 3V32, 3V33, 3V34

Gene location (Human)
Chr.	Chromosome 1 (human)
Band	1p34.3	Start	37,474,580 bp
Band	1p34.3	End	37,484,377 bp

Gene location (Mouse)
Chr.	Chromosome 4 (mouse)
Band	4|4 D2.2	Start	125,012,216 bp
Band	4|4 D2.2	End	125,021,633 bp
RNA expression pattern
Bgee	Human / Mouse (ortholog); Top expressed in: gallbladder; skin of abdomen; gastric mucosa; olfactory zone of nasal mucosa; skin of leg; cartilage tissue; granulocyte; left uterine tube; upper lobe of left lung; minor salivary glands / Top expressed in: granulocyte; lip; blood; jejunum; intestinal villus; duodenum; esophagus; thymus; muscle of thigh; spleen; More reference expression data
BioGPS	n/a
Gene ontology
Molecular function	miRNA binding; chromatin binding; metal ion binding; ribonuclease activity; protein binding; nuclease activity; endonuclease activity; mRNA binding; hydrolase activity; ribosome binding; mRNA 3'-UTR binding; mRNA 3'-UTR AU-rich region binding; DNA binding; RNA binding; endoribonuclease activity; exoribonuclease activity; thiol-dependent deubiquitinase; RNA stem-loop binding
Cellular component	cytoplasm; nucleoplasm; cytoskeleton; nucleus; extrinsic component of endoplasmic reticulum membrane; endoplasmic reticulum; rough endoplasmic reticulum membrane; rough endoplasmic reticulum; P-body; membrane; cytoplasmic ribonucleoprotein granule; protein-containing complex
Biological process	positive regulation of p38MAPK cascade; cellular response to virus; cell differentiation; positive regulation of cell death; positive regulation of autophagy; negative regulation of interleukin-6 production; positive regulation of lipid storage; negative regulation of macrophage activation; cellular response to tumor necrosis factor; negative regulation of gene expression; positive regulation of angiogenesis; negative regulation of production of miRNAs involved in gene silencing by miRNA; positive regulation of endothelial cell migration; multicellular organism development; protein deubiquitination; positive regulation of gene expression; positive regulation of reactive oxygen species metabolic process; protein complex oligomerization; angiogenesis; regulation of gene expression; positive regulation of protein import into nucleus; negative regulation by host of viral genome replication; negative regulation of tumor necrosis factor production; positive regulation of miRNA catabolic process; negative regulation of NF-kappaB transcription factor activity; positive regulation of defense response to virus by host; apoptotic process; RNA phosphodiester bond hydrolysis, endonucleolytic; immune system process; negative regulation of muscle cell apoptotic process; negative regulation of I-kappaB kinase/NF-kappaB signaling; transcription, DNA-templated; positive regulation of fat cell differentiation; positive regulation of transcription by RNA polymerase II; nuclear-transcribed mRNA catabolic process, endonucleolytic cleavage-dependent decay; defense response to virus; cellular response to glucose starvation; nervous system development; negative regulation of cytokine production involved in inflammatory response; cellular response to sodium arsenite; regulation of transcription, DNA-templated; negative regulation of protein phosphorylation; cellular response to ionomycin; positive regulation of mRNA catabolic process; cellular response to lipopolysaccharide; cellular response to oxidative stress; RNA phosphodiester bond hydrolysis; negative regulation of nitric oxide biosynthetic process; cellular response to interleukin-1; positive regulation of protein deubiquitination; cellular response to chemokine; inflammatory response; 3'-UTR-mediated mRNA destabilization; negative regulation of cardiac muscle contraction; positive regulation of execution phase of apoptosis; RNA phosphodiester bond hydrolysis, exonucleolytic; cellular response to DNA damage stimulus; immune response-activating signal transduction; negative regulation of NIK/NF-kappaB signaling; T cell receptor signaling pathway; negative regulation of T-helper 17 cell differentiation
Sources:Amigo / QuickGO
Orthologs
Databases	NCBI: entry; OMA: entry
Species	Human	Mouse
Entrez	80149	230738
Ensembl	ENSG00000163874	ENSMUSG00000042677
UniProt	Q5D1E8	Q5D1E7
RefSeq (mRNA)	NM_025079; NM_001323550; NM_001323551	NM_153159
RefSeq (protein)	NP_001310479; NP_001310480; NP_079355	NP_694799
Location (UCSC)	Chr 1: 37.47 – 37.48 Mb	Chr 4: 125.01 – 125.02 Mb
PubMed search
- Wikidata
View/Edit Human	View/Edit Mouse

Zinc finger CCCH-type containing 12A is a protein in humans that is encoded by the ZC3H12A gene.

ZC3H12A (also known as MCPIP-1 and Regnase-1) is an MCP1 (CCL2; MIM 158105)-induced protein that plays an important role in cell differentiation, apoptosis and the regulation of inflammation.
