= ZNF239 =

Protein-coding gene in the species Homo sapiens

Identifiers
- Aliases: ZNF239, HOK-2, MOK2, zinc finger protein 239
- External IDs: OMIM: 601069; MGI: 1306812; GeneCards: ZNF239

Gene location (Human)
Chr.	Chromosome 10 (human)
Band	10q11.21	Start	43,556,344 bp
Band	10q11.21	End	43,574,618 bp

Gene location (Mouse)
Chr.	Chromosome 6 (mouse)
Band	6 F1|6 55.62 cM	Start	117,862,100 bp
Band	6 F1|6 55.62 cM	End	117,873,291 bp
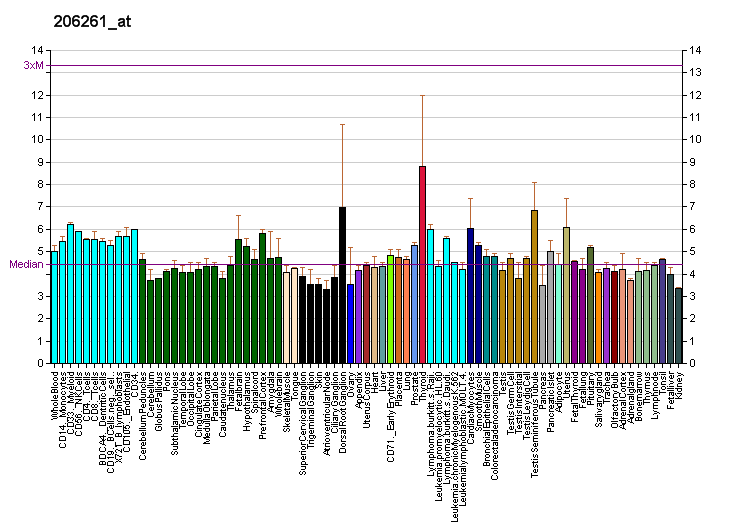
RNA expression pattern
Bgee	Human / Mouse (ortholog); Top expressed in: gonad; endothelial cell; testicle; ganglionic eminence; ventricular zone; body of pancreas; islet of Langerhans; stromal cell of endometrium; prefrontal cortex; smooth muscle tissue / Top expressed in: Ileal epithelium; cingulate gyrus; CA3 field; superior frontal gyrus; dentate gyrus; entorhinal cortex; primary visual cortex; primary motor cortex; perirhinal cortex; dentate gyrus of hippocampal formation granule cell; More reference expression data
BioGPS	More reference expression data
Gene ontology
Molecular function	DNA-binding transcription factor activity; DNA binding; protein binding; metal ion binding; nucleic acid binding; RNA polymerase II cis-regulatory region sequence-specific DNA binding; DNA-binding transcription repressor activity, RNA polymerase II-specific; DNA-binding transcription factor activity, RNA polymerase II-specific; RNA binding
Cellular component	nucleus
Biological process	regulation of transcription, DNA-templated; transcription, DNA-templated; negative regulation of transcription by RNA polymerase II; regulation of transcription by RNA polymerase II
Sources:Amigo / QuickGO
Orthologs
Databases	NCBI: entry; OMA: entry
Species	Human	Mouse
Entrez	8187	22685
Ensembl	ENSG00000196793	ENSMUSG00000042097
UniProt	Q16600	P24399
RefSeq (mRNA)	NM_001099282; NM_001099283; NM_001099284; NM_005674; NM_001324347 NM_001324348; NM_001324349; NM_001324350; NM_001324351; NM_001324352; NM_001324353	NM_001001792; NM_008616; NM_001360938
RefSeq (protein)	NP_001092752; NP_001092753; NP_001092754; NP_001311276; NP_001311277 NP_001311278; NP_001311279; NP_001311280; NP_001311281; NP_001311282; NP_005665	NP_001001792; NP_032642; NP_001347867
Location (UCSC)	Chr 10: 43.56 – 43.57 Mb	Chr 6: 117.86 – 117.87 Mb
PubMed search
- Wikidata
View/Edit Human	View/Edit Mouse

Zinc finger protein 239 is a protein that in humans is encoded by the ZNF239 gene.

== Function ==
MOK2 proteins are DNA- and RNA-binding proteins that are mainly associated with nuclear RNP components, including the nucleoli and extranucleolar structures.

== Interactions ==
ZNF239 has been shown to interact with LMNA.
