= DLG5 =

Protein-coding gene in the species Homo sapiens

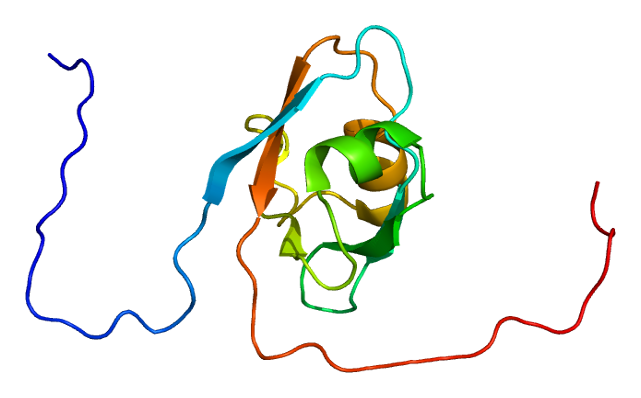

Identifiers
- Aliases: DLG5, LP-DLG, P-PDLG, discs large homolog 5, discs large MAGUK scaffold protein 5
- External IDs: OMIM: 604090; MGI: 1918478; GeneCards: DLG5
Available structures
PDB	Ortholog search: PDBe RCSB
PDB	List of PDB id codes 1UIT

Gene location (Human)
Chr.	Chromosome 10 (human)
Band	10q22.3	Start	77,790,791 bp
Band	10q22.3	End	77,926,755 bp

Gene location (Mouse)
Chr.	Chromosome 14 (mouse)
Band	14|14 A3	Start	24,184,021 bp
Band	14|14 A3	End	24,295,988 bp
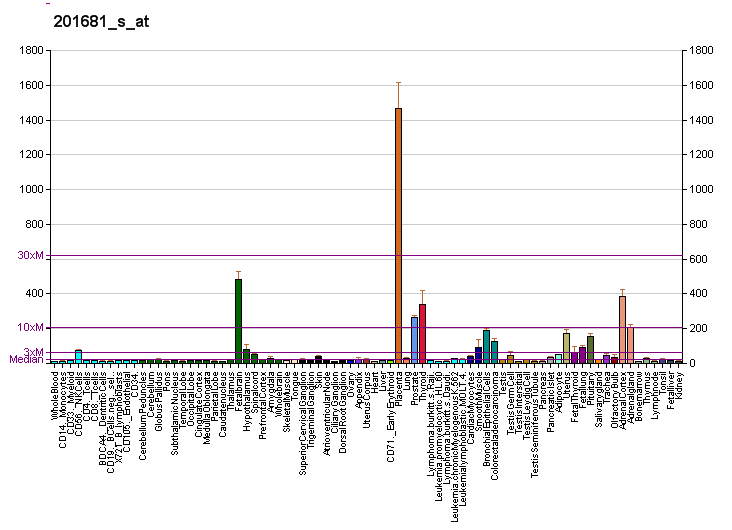
RNA expression pattern
Bgee	Human / Mouse (ortholog); Top expressed in: ventricular zone; left adrenal cortex; right adrenal cortex; ganglionic eminence; placenta; stromal cell of endometrium; pituitary gland; skin of abdomen; prostate; skin of leg / Top expressed in: genital tubercle; ventricular zone; Gonadal ridge; external carotid artery; gastrula; cumulus cell; mandibular prominence; stroma of bone marrow; tail of embryo; human fetus; More reference expression data
BioGPS	More reference expression data
Gene ontology
Molecular function	beta-catenin binding; cytoskeletal protein binding; protein binding; signaling receptor complex adaptor activity
Cellular component	membrane; plasma membrane; cell junction; postsynaptic density; ciliary basal body; cytoplasm; cytoskeleton; cell projection; synapse; postsynaptic membrane
Biological process	regulation of apoptotic process; polarized epithelial cell differentiation; intracellular signal transduction; apical protein localization; establishment or maintenance of epithelial cell apical/basal polarity; protein localization to adherens junction; metanephric collecting duct development; epithelial tube branching involved in lung morphogenesis; zonula adherens assembly; midbrain development; signal transduction; negative regulation of cell population proliferation; epithelial to mesenchymal transition; maintenance of cell polarity; negative regulation of cell migration; negative regulation of hippo signaling; positive regulation of hippo signaling; negative regulation of T cell proliferation; positive regulation of smoothened signaling pathway; positive regulation of synapse assembly; positive regulation of dendritic spine development; cell-cell adhesion; protein-containing complex assembly
Sources:Amigo / QuickGO
Orthologs
Databases	NCBI: entry; OMA: entry
Species	Human	Mouse
Entrez	9231	71228
Ensembl	ENSG00000151208; ENSG00000274429	ENSMUSG00000021782
UniProt	Q8TDM6	E9Q9R9
RefSeq (mRNA)	NM_004747	NM_001163513; NM_027726
RefSeq (protein)	NP_004738	NP_001156985; NP_082002
Location (UCSC)	Chr 10: 77.79 – 77.93 Mb	Chr 14: 24.18 – 24.3 Mb
PubMed search
- Wikidata
View/Edit Human	View/Edit Mouse

Disks large homolog 5 is a protein that in humans is encoded by the DLG5 gene.

== Function ==
This gene encodes a member of the family of discs large (DLG) homologs, a subset of the membrane-associated guanylate kinase (MAGUK) superfamily. The MAGUK proteins are composed of a catalytically inactive guanylate kinase domain, in addition to PDZ and SH3 domains, and are thought to function as scaffolding molecules at sites of cell-cell contact. The protein encoded by this gene localizes to the plasma membrane and cytoplasm, and interacts with components of adherens junctions and the cytoskeleton. It is proposed to function in the transmission of extracellular signals to the cytoskeleton and in the maintenance of epithelial cell structure. Alternative splice variants have been described but their biological nature has not been determined.

== Interactions ==
DLG5 has been shown to interact with SORBS3.
