= Spatiotemporal gene expression =

Activation of genes

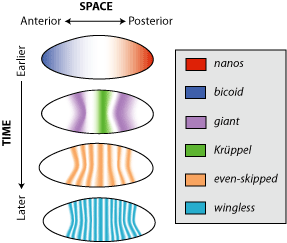
Gene expression patterns are regulated both spatially and temporally in embryos of Drosophila melanogaster.

Spatiotemporal gene expression is the activation of genes within specific tissues of an organism at specific times during development. Gene activation patterns vary widely in complexity. Some are straightforward and static, such as the pattern of tubulin, which is expressed in all cells at all times in life. Some, on the other hand, are extraordinarily intricate and difficult to predict and model, with expression fluctuating wildly from minute to minute or from cell to cell. Spatiotemporal variation plays a key role in generating the diversity of cell types found in developed organisms; since the identity of a cell is specified by the collection of genes actively expressed within that cell, if gene expression was uniform spatially and temporally, there could be at most one kind of cell.

Consider the gene wingless, a member of the wnt family of genes. In the early embryonic development of the model organism Drosophila melanogaster, or fruit fly, wingless is expressed across almost the entire embryo in alternating stripes three cells separated. This pattern is lost by the time the organism develops into a larva, but wingless is still expressed in a variety of tissues such as the wing imaginal discs, patches of tissue that will develop into the adult wings. The spatiotemporal pattern of wingless gene expression is determined by a network of regulatory interactions consisting of the effects of many different genes such as even-skipped and Krüppel.

What causes spatial and temporal differences in the expression of a single gene? Because current expression patterns depend strictly on previous expression patterns, there is a regressive problem of explaining what caused the first differences in gene expression. The process by which uniform gene expression becomes spatially and temporally differential is known as symmetry breaking. For example, in the case of embryonic Drosophila development, the genes nanos and bicoid are asymmetrically expressed in the oocyte because maternal cells deposit messenger RNA (mRNA) for these genes in the poles of the egg before it is laid.

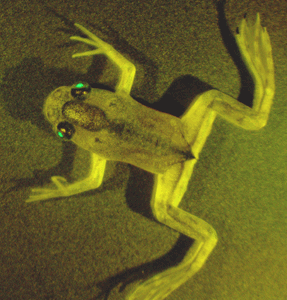
The gamma-crystalline promoter drives expression of the green fluorescent protein reporter gene exclusively in the eye of an adult frog.

== Identifying spatiotemporal patterns ==
One way to identify the expression pattern of a particular gene is to place a reporter gene downstream of its promoter. In this configuration, the promoter gene will cause the reporter gene to be expressed only where and when the gene of interest is expressed. The expression distribution of the reporter gene can be determined by visualizing it. For example, the reporter gene green fluorescent protein can be visualized by stimulating it with blue light and then using a digital camera to record green fluorescent emission.

If the promoter of the gene of interest is unknown, there are several ways to identify its spatiotemporal distribution. Immunohistochemistry involves preparing an antibody with specific affinity for the protein associated with the gene of interest. This distribution of this antibody can then be visualized by a technique such as fluorescent labeling. Immunohistochemistry has the advantages of being methodologically feasible and relatively inexpensive. Its disadvantages include non-specificity of the antibody leading to false positive identification of expression. Poor penetrance of the antibody into the target tissue can lead to false negative results. Furthermore, since immunohistochemistry visualizes the protein generated by the gene, if the protein product diffuses between cells, or has a particularly short or long half-life relative to the mRNA that is used to translate the protein, this can lead to distorted interpretation of which cells are expressing the mRNA.

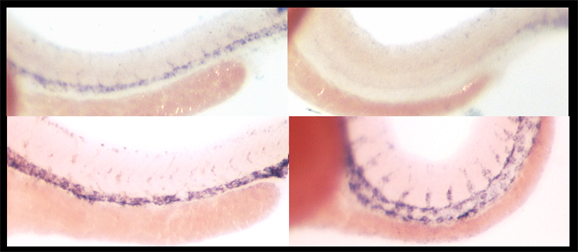
In situ hybridizations of genes expressed in arteries (top) and veins (bottom) in zebrafish. Blue staining indicates presence of the gene mRNAs. Panels on the left are normal animals, while animals on the right are mutated in the Notch gene. Fish lacking Notch have fewer arteries and more veins at this point in developmental time.

In situ hybridization is an alternate method in which a "probe," a synthetic nucleic acid with a sequence complementary to the mRNA of the gene, is added to the tissue. This probe is then chemically tagged so that it can be visualized later. This technique enables visualization specifically of mRNA-producing cells without any of the artifacts associated with immunohistochemistry. However, it is notoriously difficult, and requires knowledge of the sequence of DNA corresponding to the gene of interest.

A method called enhancer-trap screening reveals the diversity of spatiotemporal gene expression patterns possible in an organism. In this technique, DNA that encodes a reporter gene is randomly inserted into the genome. Depending on the gene promoters proximal to the insertion point, the reporter gene will be expressed in particular tissues at particular points in development. While enhancer-trap derived expression patterns do not necessarily reflect the actual patterns of expression of specific genes, they reveal the variety of spatiotemporal patterns that are accessible to evolution.

Reporter genes can be visualized in living organisms, but both immunohistochemistry and in situ hybridization must be performed in fixed tissues. Techniques that require fixation of tissue can only generate a single temporal time point per individual organism. However, using live animals instead of fixed tissue can be crucial in dynamically understanding expression patterns over an individual's lifespan. Either way, variation between individuals can confound the interpretation of temporal expression patterns.

== Methods to control spatiotemporal gene expression ==
Several methods are being pursued for controlling gene expression spatially, temporally and in different degrees. One method is by using operon inducer/repressor system which provides temporal control of gene expression. To control gene expression spatially inkjet printers are under development for printing ligands on gel culture. Other popular method involves use of light to control gene expression in spatiotemporal fashion. Since light can also be controlled easily in space, time and degree, several methods of controlling gene expression at DNA and RNA level have been developed and are under study. For example, RNA interference can be controlled using light and also patterning of gene expression has been performed in cell monolayer and in zebrafish embryos using caged morpholino or peptide nucleic acid demonstrating the control of gene expression spatiotemporally. Recently light based control has been shown at DNA level using transgene based system or caged triplex forming oligos
