= LIMA1 =

Protein-coding gene in humans

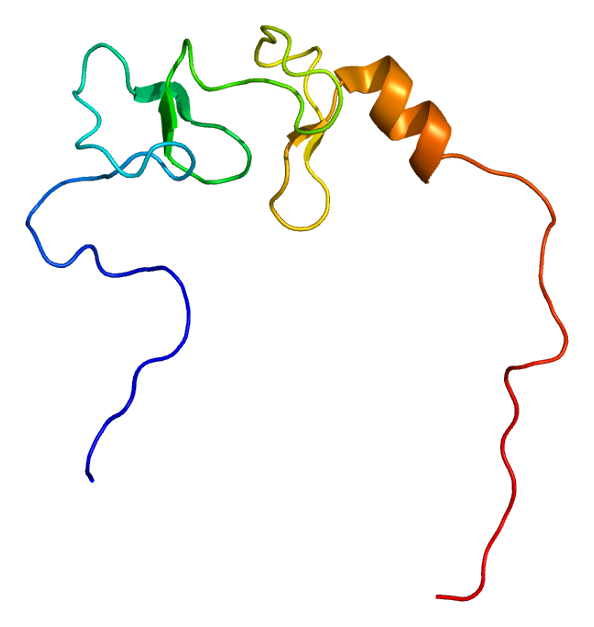

Identifiers
- Aliases: LIMA1, EPLIN, SREBP3, LIM domain and actin binding 1, LDLCQ8
- External IDs: OMIM: 608364; MGI: 1920992; GeneCards: LIMA1
Available structures
PDB	Ortholog search: PDBe RCSB
PDB	List of PDB id codes 2D8Y

Gene location (Human)
Chr.	Chromosome 12 (human)
Band	12q13.12	Start	50,175,788 bp
Band	12q13.12	End	50,283,546 bp

Gene location (Mouse)
Chr.	Chromosome 15 (mouse)
Band	15 F1|15 56.13 cM	Start	99,676,351 bp
Band	15 F1|15 56.13 cM	End	99,773,337 bp
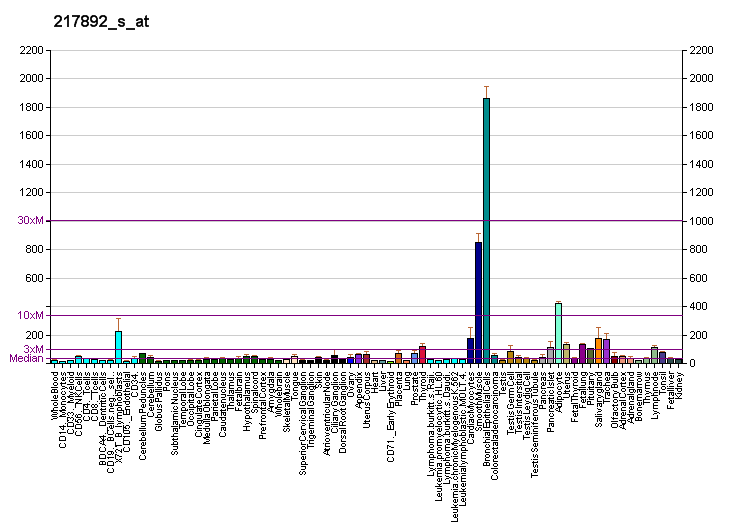
RNA expression pattern
Bgee	Human / Mouse (ortholog); Top expressed in: oocyte; secondary oocyte; tendon of biceps brachii; Achilles tendon; rectum; mucosa of colon; mucosa of sigmoid colon; subcutaneous adipose tissue; jejunal mucosa; gastric mucosa / Top expressed in: genital tubercle; lacrimal gland; transitional epithelium of urinary bladder; Rostral migratory stream; left colon; epithelium of stomach; lobe of prostate; duodenum; pyloric antrum; corneal stroma; More reference expression data
BioGPS	More reference expression data
Gene ontology
Molecular function	actin filament binding; actin binding; actin monomer binding; protein binding; metal ion binding; cadherin binding
Cellular component	cell junction; cleavage furrow; cytoskeleton; brush border; stress fiber; focal adhesion; actin cytoskeleton; cytoplasm
Biological process	negative regulation of actin filament depolymerization; ruffle organization; actin filament bundle assembly
Sources:Amigo / QuickGO
Orthologs
Databases	NCBI: entry; OMA: entry
Species	Human	Mouse
Entrez	51474	65970
Ensembl	ENSG00000050405	ENSMUSG00000023022
UniProt	Q9UHB6	Q9ERG0
RefSeq (mRNA)	NM_001113546; NM_001113547; NM_001243775; NM_016357	NM_001113545; NM_023063
RefSeq (protein)	NP_001107018; NP_001107019; NP_001230704; NP_057441	NP_001107017; NP_075550
Location (UCSC)	Chr 12: 50.18 – 50.28 Mb	Chr 15: 99.68 – 99.77 Mb
PubMed search
- Wikidata
View/Edit Human	View/Edit Mouse

LIM domain and actin-binding protein 1 is a protein that in humans is encoded by the LIMA1 gene.

EPLIN is a cytoskeleton-associated protein that inhibits actin filament depolymerization and cross-links filaments in bundles (Maul et al., 2003).[supplied by OMIM]
