= CARD9 =

Protein-coding gene in humans

Identifiers
- Aliases: CARD9, CANDF2, hcaspase recruitment domain family member 9
- External IDs: OMIM: 607212; MGI: 2685628; GeneCards: CARD9

Gene location (Human)
Chr.	Chromosome 9 (human)
Band	9q34.3	Start	136,363,956 bp
Band	9q34.3	End	136,373,681 bp

Gene location (Mouse)
Chr.	Chromosome 2 (mouse)
Band	2|2 A3	Start	26,242,188 bp
Band	2|2 A3	End	26,250,930 bp
RNA expression pattern
Bgee	Human / Mouse (ortholog); Top expressed in: monocyte; granulocyte; testicle; blood; spleen; C1 segment; bone marrow; stromal cell of endometrium; bone marrow cell; upper lobe of left lung / Top expressed in: granulocyte; bone marrow; ileum; olfactory bulb; thymus; lung; cerebellum; jejunum; spleen; cerebellar cortex; More reference expression data
BioGPS	n/a
Gene ontology
Molecular function	protein homodimerization activity; protein domain specific binding; protein binding; CARD domain binding
Cellular component	cytoplasm; cytosol; plasma membrane; protein-containing complex
Biological process	regulation of apoptotic process; response to exogenous dsRNA; immune system process; response to muramyl dipeptide; stimulatory C-type lectin receptor signaling pathway; positive regulation of JNK cascade; response to fungus; defense response to virus; response to peptidoglycan; positive regulation of interleukin-6 production; positive regulation of innate immune response; positive regulation of tumor necrosis factor production; positive regulation of I-kappaB kinase/NF-kappaB signaling; I-kappaB kinase/NF-kappaB signaling; positive regulation of stress-activated MAPK cascade; defense response to Gram-positive bacterium; innate immune response; positive regulation of cysteine-type endopeptidase activity involved in apoptotic process
Sources:Amigo / QuickGO
Orthologs
Databases	NCBI: entry; OMA: entry
Species	Human	Mouse
Entrez	64170	332579
Ensembl	ENSG00000187796	ENSMUSG00000026928
UniProt	Q9H257	A2AIV8
RefSeq (mRNA)	NM_052814; NM_052813; NM_022352	NM_001037747
RefSeq (protein)	NP_434700; NP_434701	NP_001032836
Location (UCSC)	Chr 9: 136.36 – 136.37 Mb	Chr 2: 26.24 – 26.25 Mb
PubMed search
- Wikidata
View/Edit Human	View/Edit Mouse

Caspase recruitment domain-containing protein 9 is an adaptor protein of the CARD-CC protein family, which in humans is encoded by the CARD9 gene. It mediates signals from pattern recognition receptors to activate pro-inflammatory and anti-inflammatory cytokines, regulating inflammation. Homozygous mutations in CARD9 are associated with defective innate immunity against yeasts, like Candida and dermatophytes.

== Function ==
CARD9 is a member of the CARD protein family, which is defined by the presence of a characteristic caspase-associated recruitment domain (CARD). This protein was identified by its selective association with the CARD domain of BCL10, a positive regulator and NF-κB activation. It is thought to function as a molecular scaffold for the assembly of a BCL10 signaling complex that activates NF-κB. Several alternatively spliced transcript variants have been observed, but their full-length nature is not clearly defined.

== Clinical significance ==
In 2006, it became clear that Card9 plays important roles within the innate immune response against yeasts. Card9 mediates signals from so called pattern recognition receptors (Dectin-1) to downstream signalling pathways such as NF-κB and by this activates pro-inflammatory cytokines (TNF, IL-23, IL-6, IL-2) and an anti-inflammatory cytokine (IL-10) and subsequently an appropriate innate and adaptive immune response to clear an infection. An autosomal recessive form of susceptibility to chronic mucocutaneous candidiasis was found in 2009 to be associated with homozygous mutations in CARD9. Deep dermatophytosis and Card9 deficiency reported in an Iranian family led to its discovery in 17 people from Tunisian, Algerian, and Moroccan families with deep dermatophytosis.

CARD9 mutations have been associated with inflammatory diseases such as ankylosing spondylitis and inflammatory bowel disease (Crohn's Disease and Ulcerative Colitis). A genetic variant, c.IVS11+1G>C was found to be protective against crohn's disease, ulcerative colitis, and ankylosing spondilitis by Manuel Rivas, Mark Daly and colleagues. CARD9 S12NΔ11, is a rare splice variant in which exon 11 of CARD9 is deleted. This allele, identified by deep sequencing of GWAS loci, results in a protein with a C-terminal truncation. In a functional follow-up study, using re-expressed human CARD9 isoforms in murine Card9−/− bone marrow-derived dendritic cells (BMDCs) were assessed for cytokine production. BMDCs expressing the predisposing variant CARD9 S12N showed increased TNFα and IL-6 production compared to BMDCs expressing wild-type CARD9. In contrast, CARD9 Δ11 and CARD9 S12NΔ11, as well as the C-terminal truncated variant CARD9 V6, showed significant impairment in TNFα and IL-6 production. CARD9 Δ11 was found to have a dominant negative effect on CARD9 function when co-expressed with wild-type CARD9 in human and mouse dendritic cells.
