= DLG2 =

Protein-coding gene in the species Homo sapiens

Identifiers
- Aliases: DLG2, PPP1R58, PSD-93, PSD93, chapsyn-110, discs large homolog 2, discs large MAGUK scaffold protein 2
- External IDs: OMIM: 603583; MGI: 1344351; GeneCards: DLG2
Available structures
PDB	Ortholog search: PDBe RCSB
PDB	List of PDB id codes 2BYG, 2HE2

Gene location (Human)
Chr.	Chromosome 11 (human)
Band	11q14.1	Start	83,455,012 bp
Band	11q14.1	End	85,627,922 bp

Gene location (Mouse)
Chr.	Chromosome 7 (mouse)
Band	7 E1|7 51.07 cM	Start	90,476,672 bp
Band	7 E1|7 51.07 cM	End	92,449,247 bp
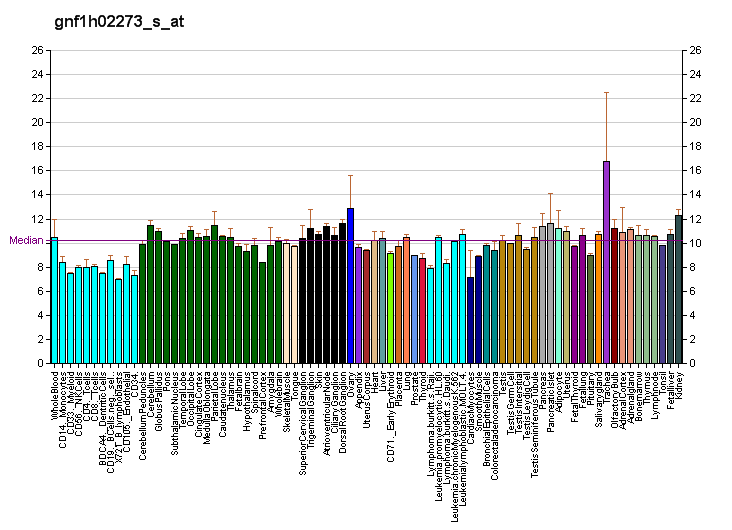

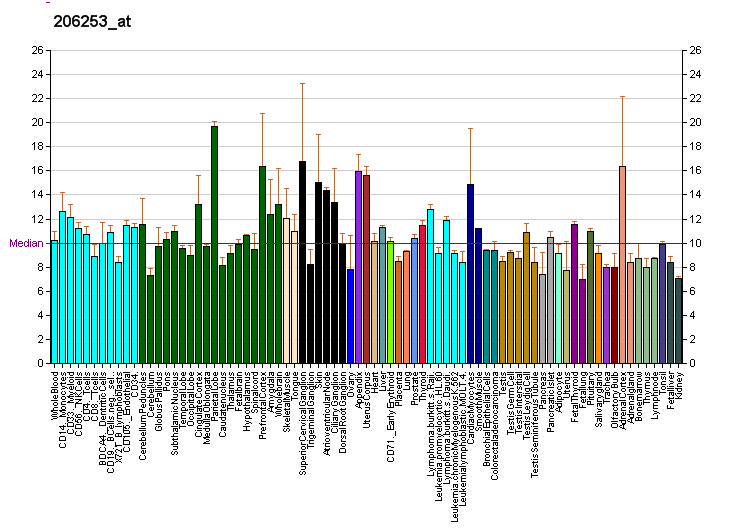
RNA expression pattern
Bgee	Human / Mouse (ortholog); Top expressed in: endothelial cell; corpus callosum; inferior ganglion of vagus nerve; prefrontal cortex; right frontal lobe; entorhinal cortex; middle temporal gyrus; nucleus accumbens; hippocampus proper; Brodmann area 23 / Top expressed in: superior frontal gyrus; lateral septal nucleus; lobe of cerebellum; piriform cortex; dentate gyrus of hippocampal formation granule cell; olfactory tubercle; cerebellar vermis; anterior amygdaloid area; primary motor cortex; neural layer of retina; More reference expression data
BioGPS	More reference expression data
Gene ontology
Molecular function	guanylate kinase activity; kinase binding; protein binding; ionotropic glutamate receptor binding; structural constituent of postsynaptic density
Cellular component	postsynaptic membrane; cell projection; membrane; postsynaptic density; voltage-gated potassium channel complex; plasma membrane; synapse; axon; cell junction; basolateral plasma membrane; ionotropic glutamate receptor complex; juxtaparanode region of axon; cytosol; neuromuscular junction; neuron projection; postsynaptic density membrane; glutamatergic synapse; axon cytoplasm
Biological process	chemical synaptic transmission; receptor localization to synapse; negative regulation of phosphatase activity; receptor clustering; nervous system development; establishment or maintenance of epithelial cell apical/basal polarity; sensory perception of pain; GDP metabolic process; GMP metabolic process; MAPK cascade; cellular response to potassium ion; cell-cell adhesion; maintenance of postsynaptic density structure; anterograde axonal protein transport; retrograde axonal protein transport; neurotransmitter receptor localization to postsynaptic specialization membrane; regulation of NMDA receptor activity
Sources:Amigo / QuickGO
Orthologs
Databases	NCBI: entry; OMA: entry
Species	Human	Mouse
Entrez	1740	23859
Ensembl	ENSG00000150672	ENSMUSG00000052572
UniProt	Q15700	Q91XM9
RefSeq (mRNA)	NM_001142699; NM_001142700; NM_001142702; NM_001206769; NM_001300983 NM_001364; NM_001351274; NM_001351275; NM_001351276; NM_001377966; NM_001377967; NM_001377968; NM_001377970; NM_001377971; NM_001377972; NM_001377973; NM_001377974; NM_001377975; NM_001377976; NM_001377977; NM_001377978; NM_001377979; NM_001377980; NM_001377981; NM_001377982; NM_001377983; NM_175892	NM_001243046; NM_001243047; NM_011807
RefSeq (protein)	NP_001136171; NP_001136172; NP_001136174; NP_001193698; NP_001287912 NP_001355; NP_001338203; NP_001338204; NP_001338205; NP_001364895; NP_001364896; NP_001364897; NP_001364899; NP_001364900; NP_001364901; NP_001364902; NP_001364903; NP_001364904; NP_001364905; NP_001364906; NP_001364907; NP_001364908; NP_001364909; NP_001364910; NP_001364911; NP_001364912	NP_001229975; NP_001229976; NP_035937
Location (UCSC)	Chr 11: 83.46 – 85.63 Mb	Chr 7: 90.48 – 92.45 Mb
PubMed search
- Wikidata
View/Edit Human	View/Edit Mouse

Disks large homolog 2 (DLG2) also known as channel-associated protein of synapse-110 (chapsyn-110) or postsynaptic density protein 93 (PSD-93) is a protein that in humans is encoded by the DLG2 gene.

== Function ==
Chapsyn-110/PSD-93 a member of the membrane-associated guanylate kinase (MAGUK) family. The protein forms a heterodimer with a related family member that may interact at postsynaptic sites to form a multimeric scaffold for the clustering of receptors, ion channels, and associated signaling proteins. Alternatively spliced transcript variants encoding distinct isoforms have been described but their full-length nature has yet to be completely determined.

== Interactions ==
DLG2 has been shown to interact with GRIN2B, KCNJ12.
