= Paracaspase =

Class of enzymes

Paracaspases (human: MALT1) are members of the C14 family of cysteine proteases. Paracaspases are proteins related to caspases present in animals and slime mold, in contrast to metacaspases, which are present in plants, fungi, and "protists". The phylogenetic distribution is a bit confusing, since slime mold diverged earlier than the animal/fungal split.

Paracaspase has been first identified in a recurrent t(11;18)(q21;q21) chromosomal translocation associated with a subset of MALT lymphoma. This leads to a fusion oncoprotein consisting of the carboxyl terminus of MALT1 and the amino terminus of c-IAP2. Paracaspases are more similar to caspases than metacaspases are, indicating that this group of proteases diverged from caspases from a common metacaspase ancestor.

== Structure and Evolution ==
Most non-metazoan paracaspases found in amoebas or bacteria are "type 2" paracaspases with only a caspase-like domain. The animal paracaspases are most likely not directly related to the amoeba paracaspase. It is currently unclear whether the paracaspases (and caspases) found in eukaryotes are a result from several (at least 2) independent horizontal gene transfer events from prokaryotes or if there has been a convergent evolution of (para)caspases evolved from the metacaspases in several different organisms within the eukaryotes.

=== Animals ===
==== "Type 2" ====
The "type 2" paracaspases in animals represent the ancestral form which only consists of a caspase-like domain. This form of paracaspase can be found in ctenophora, trichoplax, sponges and cnidarians. Cnidarians also have "type 1" paracaspases.

==== "Type 1" ====
Species key: Hs= Human, Gg = Chicken, Xt = African clawed frog, Dr = Zebrafish, Cm = Elephant Shark, Pm = Lamprey, Bf = Lancelet, Sk = Acorn worm, Cg = Pacific oyster, Ob = Octopus, Dp = Daphnia, Am = Honey bee, Ce = nematode, Nv = Nematostella, Hv = Hydra.

The "type 1" paracaspases are characterized by a MALT1-like domain composition with a death domain, immunoglobulin-like domains and a caspase-like domain. The "type 1" paracaspases first originated sometime before the last common ancestor of the bilaterans and cnidaria, indicating that "type 1" paracaspases originated during the ediacaran period. The jawed vertebrates (starting from sharks) have 3 paralogs: PCASP1, PCASP2 and PCASP3. PCASP3 is the ancestral copy and can be found in all deuterostomes, like sea urchin, lancelets, tunicates and lampreys (a non-jawed vertebrate). Notably, mammals have lost PCASP2 and PCASP3 and only have PCASP1 (MALT1). The non-deuterostome invertebrate type 1 paracaspase closest related to PCASP3 can surprisingly be found in molluscs, which could indicate that there were 2 paralog type 1 paracaspases present in the first bilaterans (like in cnidarians), and that different bilateran lineages have kept one or the other paralog.

== Known functions ==
=== Amoebas ===
The paracaspase in Dictyostelium seems to regulate osmotic stress tolerance by vacuolar expansion.

=== Animals ===
Paracaspase in animals has mostly been studied in humans and mice (see: MALT1), where it plays a major role in several pro-inflammatory pathways in innate- and adaptive- immunity. The distantly related zebrafish PCASP3 show conserved MALT1-like activity in NF-kappaB activation and protease substrate specificity, indicating that these functions were present in the last common ancestor of the three vertebrate paracaspase paralogs. There are also indications that paracaspase is involved in immune- and NF-κB signaling also in invertebrates.

== See also ==
- The Proteolysis Map
- MALT1
- Caspase
- Metacaspase
- MALT lymphoma
