= MALT lymphoma =

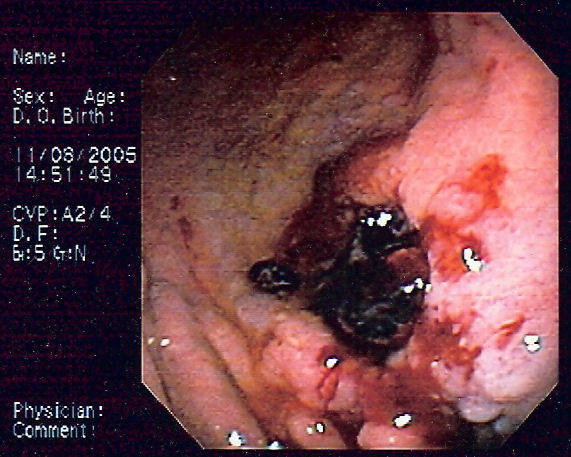
- Endoscopic image of gastric MALT lymphoma taken in body of stomach in patient who presented with upper GI hemorrhage. Appearance is similar to gastric ulcer with adherent clot.
- Specialty: Oncology

MALT lymphoma (also called MALToma, Nodal Marginal Zone Lymphoma or Extra Nodal Marginal Zone Lymphoma) a form of lymphoma involving the mucosa-associated lymphoid tissue (MALT), frequently of the stomach, but virtually any mucosal site can be affected, including breasts. It is a cancer originating from B cells in the marginal zone of the MALT.

== Diagnosis and staging ==
MALT lymphoma is often a multifocal disease in the organ of origin and is frequently macroscopically indistinguishable from other disease processes in the GI tract. Endoscopy is key to diagnosing MALT lymphoma, with multiple biopsies of the visible lesions required, as well as samples of macroscopically normal tissue, termed gastric mapping. Histologically, there is expansion of the marginal zone compartment with development of sheets of neoplastic small lymphoid cells. The morphology of the neoplastic cells is variable with small mature lymphocytes, cells resembling centrocytes (centrocyte like cells), or marginal zone/monocytoid B cells. Plasmacytoid or plasmacytic differentiation is frequent. Lymphoid follicles are ubiquitous to MALT lymphoma but may be indistinct as they are often overrun or colonized by the neoplastic cells. Large transformed B cells are presently scattered among the small cell population. If these large cells are present in clusters or sheets, a diagnosis of associated large B-cell lymphoma should be considered. A characteristic feature of MALT lymphoma is the presence of neoplastic cells within epithelial structures with associated destruction of the glandular architecture to form lymphoepithelial lesions.

MALT lymphoma may be difficult to distinguish from reactive infiltrates, and in some cases, multiple endoscopies are required before a confident diagnosis is reached. The Wotherspoon score, which grades the presence of histological features associated with MALT lymphoma, is useful in expressing confidence in diagnosis at presentation. Immunohistochemistry can be used to help distinguish MALT lymphoma from other small B-cell NHLs. B-cell-associated antigens such as CD19, CD20, CD22, and CD79a are usually expressed. In contrast to small lymphocytic lymphoma and mantle cell lymphoma (MCL), staining for CD5 is usually negative, and these lymphomas can be further distinguished with CD23 (positive in small lymphocytic lymphoma) and CyclinD1 (positive in MCL).

== Associations ==
Gastric MALT lymphoma is frequently associated (72–98%) with chronic inflammation as a result of the presence of Helicobacter pylori, potentially involving chronic inflammation, or the action of H. pylori virulence factors such as CagA.

The initial diagnosis is made by biopsy of suspicious lesions on esophagogastroduodenoscopy (EGD, upper endoscopy). Simultaneous tests for H. pylori are also done to detect the presence of this microbe.

In other sites, chronic immune stimulation is also suspected in the pathogenesis (e.g. association between chronic autoimmune diseases such as Sjögren's syndrome and Hashimoto's thyroiditis, and MALT lymphoma of the salivary gland and the thyroid).

== Treatment ==
Owing to the causal relationship between H. pylori infection and gastric MALT lymphoma, identification of the infection is imperative. Histological examination of GI biopsies yields a sensitivity of 95% with five biopsies, but these should be from sites uninvolved by lymphoma and the identification of the organism may be compromised by areas of extensive intestinal metaplasia. As proton-pump inhibition can suppress infection, any treatment with this class of drug should be ceased 2 weeks prior to biopsy retrieval. Serology should be performed if histology is negative, to detect suppressed or recently treated infections. Following the recognition of the association of gastric MALT lymphoma with H. pylori infection, it was established that early-stage gastric disease could be cured by H. pylori eradication, which is now the mainstay of therapy. Fifty to 95% of cases achieve complete response (CR) with H. pylori treatment.

A t(11;18)(q21;q21) chromosomal translocation, giving rise to an API2-MLT fusion gene, is predictive of poor response to eradication therapy.

=== Radiotherapy ===
Radiotherapy is a valid first option for MALT lymphoma. It provides local control and potential cure in localized gastric stage IE and II 1E disease with 5-year EFS of 85-100% reported in retrospective studies. However, the irradiation field is potentially large as it must include the whole stomach, which can vary greatly in size and shape. Irradiation techniques have improved considerably in the last 20 years, including treating the patient in a fasting state, decreasing the irradiated field and required dose. The moderate dose of 30 Gray (Gy) of involved-field radiotherapy administered in 15 fractions (doses) can be associated with tolerable toxicity and excellent outcomes. Hence, radiotherapy is the preferred approach for local disease where antibiotic therapy has failed, or is not indicated. Evidence also suggests that radiotherapy can be utilized to control localized relapses outside the original radiation field.

=== Chemotherapy ===
MALT lymphoma is exquisitely immunotherapy sensitive. Chemotherapy is reserved for those uncommon patients with disseminated disease at presentation or lack of response to local treatment. Rituximab, the anti-CD20 chimeric antibody, is a key component of therapy. Responses vary from 55% to 77% with monotherapy and 100% in combination with chemotherapy. Ocular MALT lymphoma can be treated by intralesional administration of rituximab. Oral alkylating agents such as cyclophosphamide or chlorambucil have been administered for a median duration of 12 months with high rates of disease control (CR up to 75%) but appear not to be active in t(11;18) disease. The purine nucleoside analogs fludarabine and cladribine also demonstrate activity, the latter conferring a CR rate of 84% (100% in those with gastric primaries) in a small study. A pivotal study of rituximab plus chlorambucil compared with chlorambucil alone (IELSG-19 study, n = 227) demonstrated a significantly higher CR rate (78% vs. 65%; p = 0.017) and 5-year EFS (68% vs. 50%; p = 0.024) over chlorambucil alone. However, 5-year OS was not improved (88% in both arms). First-line treatment of choice is generally rituximab in combination with single alkylating agents or fludarabine, or a combination of all three drugs. The final results of this study, including the later addition of a rituximab-alone arm, are pending.

Two other genetic alterations are known:

- t(1;14)(p22;q32), which deregulates BCL10, at the locus 1p22.
- t(14;18)(q32;q21), which deregulates MALT1, at the locus 18q21.

These seem to turn on the same pathway as API2-MLT (i.e., that of NF-κB). They both act upon IGH, which is at the locus 14q32.

== Epidemiology ==
Of all cancers involving the same class of blood cell, 8% of cases are MALT lymphomas.

== See also ==
- Primary cutaneous marginal zone lymphoma
