= Membrane-associated guanylate kinase =

Membrane-associated guanylate kinase (MAGUK) scaffold protein

Identifiers
- Symbol: MAGUK
- InterPro: IPR016313

The membrane-associated guanylate kinases (MAGUK) are a family of proteins. The MAGUKs are defined by their inclusion of PDZ, SH3 and GUK domains, although many of them also contain regions homologous of CaMKII, WW and L27 domains. The GUK domain that they have is structurally very similar to that of the guanylate kinases, however it is known to be catalytically inactive as the P-Loop which binds ATP is absent. It is thought that the MAGUKs have subfunctionalized the GUK domain for their own purposes, primarily based on its ability to form protein–protein interactions with cytoskeleton proteins, microtubule/actin based machinery and molecules involved in signal transduction.

MAGUKs also contain multiple PDZ domains, or short peptide binding sequences commonly bind to the C-terminus of interacting proteins. The number of PDZ domain copies varies between different members of the MAGUK family. The PDZ domains found within each family member often have different binding partners, due to variations in their amino acid compositions. The SH3 domain is again a protein–protein interaction domain. Its family generally bind to PXXP sites, but in MAGUKs it is known to bind to other sites as well. One of the most well known features is that it can form an intramolecular bond with the GUK domain, creating what is known as a GUK-SH3 'closed' state.

== Examples ==
Humans genes encoding members of the MAGUK protein superfamily include:

- DLG1, DLG2, DLG3, DLG4, DLG5
