= GSDMD =

Protein found in humans

Identifiers
- Aliases: GSDMD, DF5L, DFNA5L, GSDMDC1, FKSG10, gasdermin D
- External IDs: OMIM: 617042; MGI: 1916396; GeneCards: GSDMD

Gene location (Human)
Chr.	Chromosome 8 (human)
Band	8q24.3	Start	143,553,207 bp
Band	8q24.3	End	143,563,062 bp

Gene location (Mouse)
Chr.	Chromosome 15 (mouse)
Band	15|15 D3	Start	75,734,176 bp
Band	15|15 D3	End	75,739,257 bp
RNA expression pattern
Bgee	Human / Mouse (ortholog); Top expressed in: spleen; mucosa of transverse colon; granulocyte; right lobe of liver; duodenum; blood; right lobe of thyroid gland; apex of heart; upper lobe of left lung; right lung / Top expressed in: granulocyte; jejunum; duodenum; epithelium of small intestine; ileum; large intestine; colon; mesenteric lymph nodes; left colon; bone marrow; More reference expression data
BioGPS	n/a
Gene ontology
Molecular function	protein binding; phosphatidylserine binding; phosphatidylinositol-4,5-bisphosphate binding; phosphatidylinositol-4-phosphate binding; phosphatidic acid binding; cardiolipin binding
Cellular component	cytoplasm; inflammasome complex; nucleoplasm; NLRP3 inflammasome complex; extracellular region; extracellular space; cytosol; plasma membrane; membrane; specific granule lumen; tertiary granule lumen; ficolin-1-rich granule lumen
Biological process	cellular response to extracellular stimulus; innate immune response; inflammatory response; programmed cell death; immune system process; pyroptosis; cytolysis; pore formation in membrane of other organism; neutrophil degranulation; pore complex assembly; defense response to Gram-negative bacterium; defense response to Gram-positive bacterium; protein homooligomerization
Sources:Amigo / QuickGO
Orthologs
Databases	NCBI: entry; OMA: entry
Species	Human	Mouse
Entrez	79792	69146
Ensembl	ENSG00000278718; ENSG00000104518	ENSMUSG00000022575
UniProt	P57764	Q9D8T2
RefSeq (mRNA)	NM_001166237; NM_024736	NM_026960
RefSeq (protein)	NP_001159709; NP_079012	NP_081236
Location (UCSC)	Chr 8: 143.55 – 143.56 Mb	Chr 15: 75.73 – 75.74 Mb
PubMed search
- Wikidata
View/Edit Human	View/Edit Mouse

Gasdermin D (GSDMD, from combination of gastro and dermato, referencing the locations where its family of proteins were originally found to be primarily expressed) is a protein that in humans is encoded by the GSDMD gene on chromosome 8. It belongs to the gasdermin family which is conserved among vertebrates and comprises six members in humans, GSDMA, GSDMB, GSDMC, GSDMD, GSDME (DFNA5) and DFNB59 (Pejvakin). Members of the gasdermin family are expressed in a variety of cell types including epithelial cells and immune cells. GSDMA, GSDMB, GSDMC, GSDMD and GSDME have been suggested to act as tumour suppressors.

== Structure ==
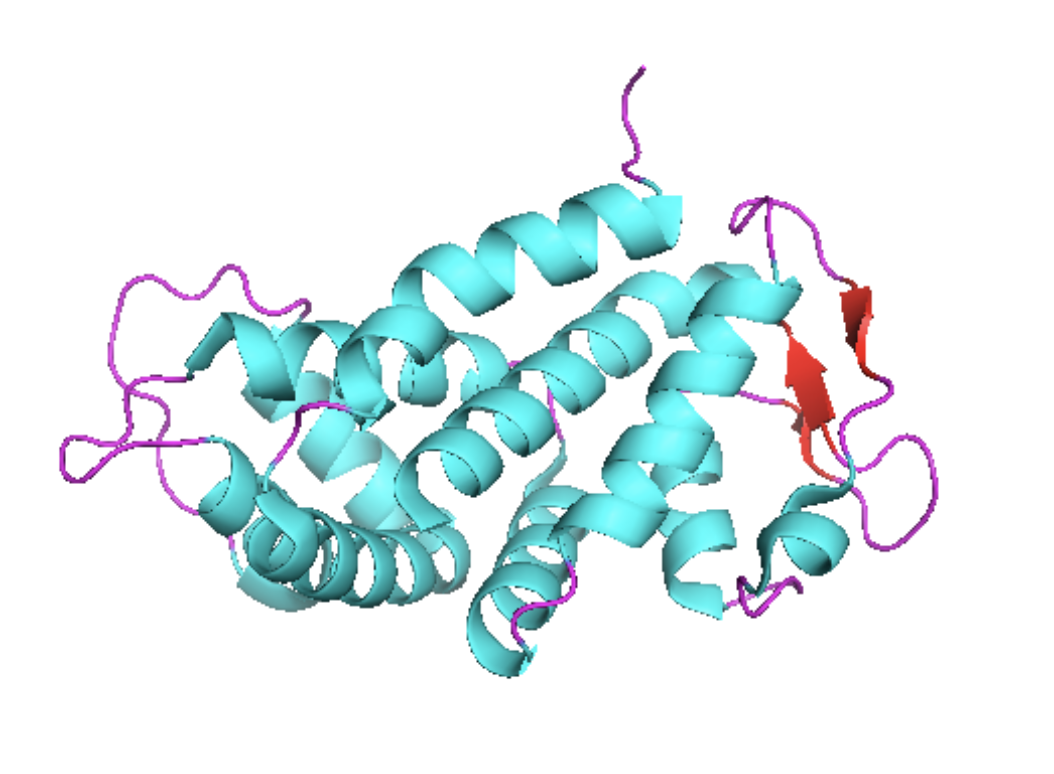
Structure of GSDMD C-terminal domain

The structure of full-length GSDMD consists of two domains, the 31 kDa N-terminal (GSDMD-N) and 22 kDa C-terminal (GSDMD-C) domains, separated by a linker region. GSDMD-C can be divided into four subdomains and is composed of 10 α-helices and two β-strands, forming a compact globular fold. The linker helix contacts the two helix-repeats which consist of four-helix bundles. The middle domain comprises an antiparallel β-strand and a short α-helix. The first flexible loop of GSDMD-C, which is located between GSDMD-N and the linker helix, stretches out and inserts into the GSDMD-N pocket, stabilizing the conformation of the full-length protein. GSDMD-N forms large transmembrane pores composed of 31 to 34 subunits that allow the release of interleukin-1 (IL-1) family cytokines and drive pyroptosis.

== Function ==
Several current studies have revealed that GSDMD serves as a specific substrate of inflammatory caspases (caspase-1, -4, -5 and -11) and as an effector molecule for the lytic and highly inflammatory form of programmed cell death known as pyroptosis. Hence, GSDMD is an essential mediator of host defence against microbial infection and danger signals. The pore-forming activity of the N-terminal cleavage product causes cell swelling and lysis to prevent intracellular pathogens from replicating, and is required for the release of cytoplasmic content such as the inflammatory cytokine interleukin-1β (IL-1β) into the extracellular space to recruit and activate immune cells to the site of infection. GSDMD has an additional potential role as an antimicrobial by binding to cardiolipin (CL) and form pores on bacterial membranes.

== Autoinhibition ==
Under normal conditions, the full-length GSDMD is inactive as the linker loop between the N-terminal and C-terminal domains stabilises the overall conformation of the full-length protein and allows GSDMD-C to fold back on and auto-inhibit GSDMD-N from inducing pyroptosis. Upon interdomain cleavage by inflammatory caspases, the auto-inhibition is relieved and GSDMD-N cytotoxicity is triggered.

== Activation ==
GSDMD can be cleaved and activated by inflammatory caspases through both the canonical and non-canonical pyroptotic pathways.

=== Canonical inflammasome pathway ===
Caspase-1, conserved in vertebrates, is involved in the canonical pathway and is activated by canonical inflammasomes such as NLRP3 and NLRC4 inflammasomes, which are multi-protein complexes that are formed upon recognition of specific inflammatory ligands called pathogen-associated molecular patterns (PAMPs) and damage-associated molecular patterns (DAMPs) in the cytosol by NOD-like receptors (NLRs). Examples include bacterial type 3 secretion system (T3SS) rod protein and flagellin, which are potent activators of NLRC4 inflammasome, and bacterial toxin nigericin that activates NLRP3 inflammasome.

=== Non-canonical inflammasome pathway ===
Caspase-11 in mice and its human homolog caspase-4 and -5 are involved in the non-canonical pathway and are activated by directly binding cytosolic lipopolysaccharide (LPS) secreted by gram-negative bacteria.

Upon activation of these caspases, GSDMD undergoes proteolytic cleavage at Asp-275, which is sufficient to drive pyroptosis.

== Mechanism ==
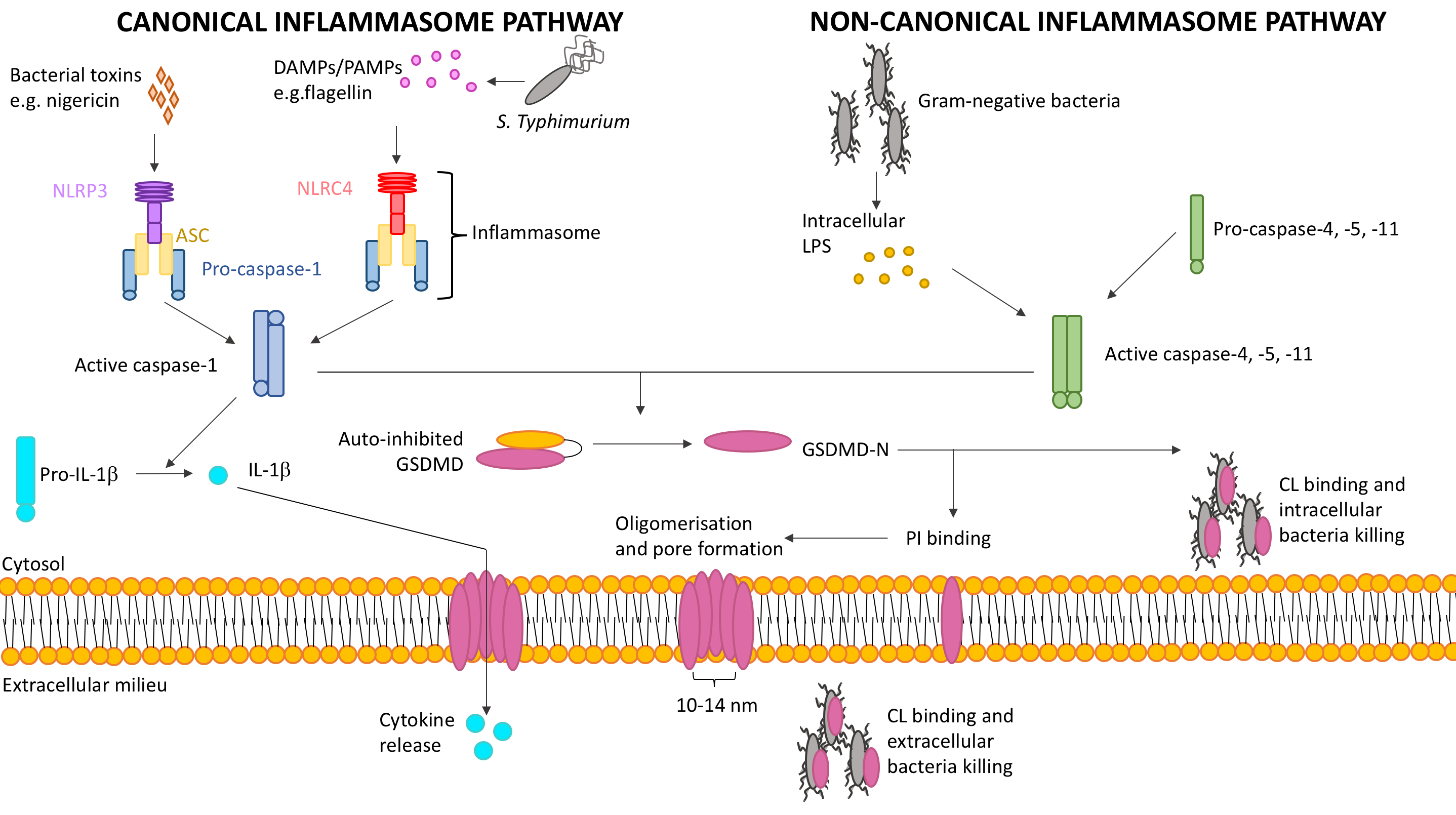
Overview of GSDMD activation and pore-forming mechanism

After the proteolytic cleavage, GSDMD-C remains in the cytosol while the N-terminal cleavage product localises to the plasma membrane by anchoring to membrane lipids. GSDMD-N specifically interacts with phosphatidylinositol 4-phosphate [PI(4)P] and phosphatidylinositol 4,5-bisphosphate [PI(4,5)P] on the inner leaflet of mammalian cell membrane strongly, through charge-charge interactions between the negatively-charged head groups of PI and the positively-charged surface on GSDMD-N exposed after cleavage. Hence, collateral damage to tissues during an infection is minimised as the extracellular outer leaflet lacks PI. Lipid binding allows GSDMD-N to insert into the lipid bilayer and induces high-order oligomerisation within the membrane, forming extensive pores with approximately 16 subunits and an inner diameter of 10–14 nm. The osmotic potential is disrupted by pore formation, leading to cell swelling and lysis, the morphologic hallmarks of pyroptosis. The pores also serve as a protein secretion channel to facilitate the secretion of inflammatory cytokines for rapid innate immune response. GSDMD-N can also undergo cytoplasmic distribution and selectively bind to CL on inner and outer leaflets of intracellular bacterial membranes, or be secreted from pyroptotic cells through the pores into the extracellular milieu to target and kill extracellular bacteria.

== Clinical significance ==
Pyroptosis, which can be defined as gasdermin-mediated necrotic cell death, acts as an immune defence against infection. Hence, failure to express or cleave GSDMD can block pyroptosis and disrupt the secretion of IL-1β, and eventually unable to ablate the replicative niche of intracellular bacteria. Mutation of GSDMD is associated with various genetic diseases and human cancers, including brain, breast, lung, urinary bladder, cervical, skin, oral cavity, pharynx, colon, liver, cecum, stomach, pancreatic, prostate, oesophageal, head and neck, hematologic, thyroid and uterine cancers. Recently, studies have revealed that downregulation of GSDMD promotes gastric cancer proliferation due to the failure to inactivate ERK 1/2, STAT3 and PI3K/AKT pathways, which are involved in cell survival and tumour progression. However, sepsis and lethal septic shock can result from overactivation of pyroptosis.

Gasdermin D also plays a pivotal role in inflammation related MDS development and progression, gasdermin D knockout significantly extends the survival in MDS mouse model. The critical role of GSDMD in pore formation during pyroptosis provides a new avenue for future drug development for treating inflammatory caspase-associated auto-inflammatory conditions, sepsis and septic shock.

== Interactions ==
GSDMD-N has been shown to interact with:

- Phosphatidylinositol 4-phosphate
- Phosphatidylinositol (4,5)-bisphosphate
- Phosphatidylinositol 3-phosphate
- Phosphatidylinositol 5-phosphate
- Phosphatidylinositol (3,4)-bisphosphate
- Phosphatidylinositol (3,5)-bisphosphate
- Phosphatidylinositol (3,4,5)-trisphosphate
- Phosphatidic acid
- Phosphatidylserine
- Phosphatidylethanolamine
- Cardiolipin

== See also ==
- Pyroptosis
- Inflammasome
- GSDMA
- GSDMB
- GSDMC
- DFNA5
- Caspases
- Caspase-1
- Caspase-4
- Caspase-5
- Caspase-11
- Interleukin-1β
