= Vishva Dixit =

Kenyan molecular biologist

Vishva M. Dixit
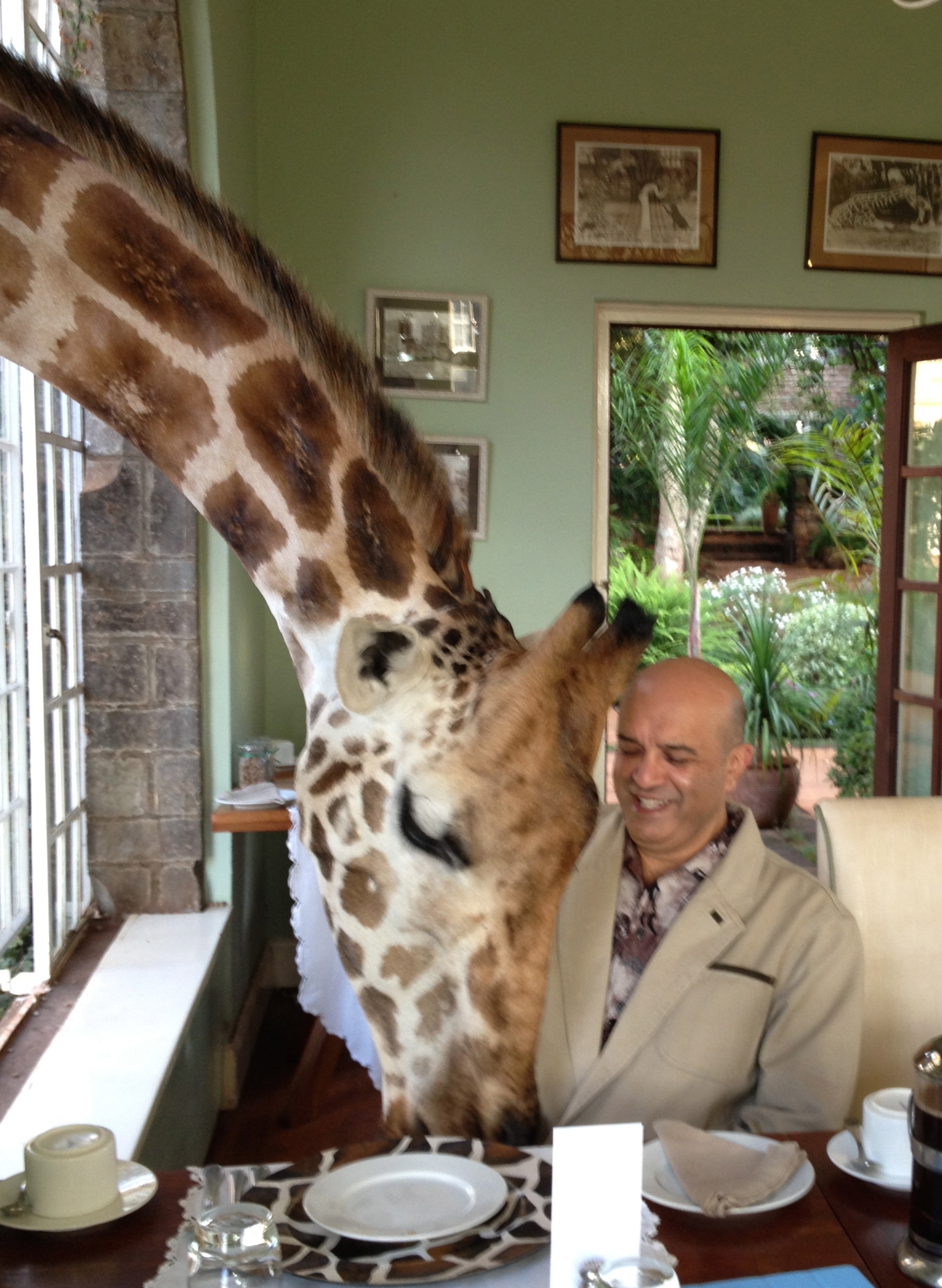
- Vishva M. Dixit eats breakfast at the Giraffe Manor in Nairobi, Kenya.
- Born: Kisii, Kenya
- Education: University of Nairobi
- Known for: apoptosis inflammation ubiquitin signaling
- Awards: Member of National Academy of Sciences; Member of National Academy of Medicine; Member of American Academy of Arts and Sciences; Foreign Member of The Royal Society (ForMemRS)
- Scientific career
- Fields: molecular biology immunology cancer research
- Workplaces: Genentech; University of Michigan Medical School; Washington University School of Medicine

Vishva Mitra Dixit (born c. 1956) is a Kenyan-American physician who is currently Vice President and Senior Fellow of Physiological Chemistry and Research Biology at Genentech. In 2026, he was elected to the American Philosophical Society.

== Early life and education ==
Vishva Dixit was born in Kenya in 1956. His parents were both physicians, working for the British colonial authorities. Dixit was interested in science from an early age, and his parents encouraged him to pursue a career in medicine. He graduated in 1980 from the University of Nairobi with a Bachelor of Medicine and Bachelor of Surgery, becoming a medical doctor.

== Career ==
=== Academia ===
Following medical school, Dixit completed a residency in the Department of Pathology at the Washington University School of Medicine. He decided to pursue pathology because he had been interested in the process of death since childhood and pathology offered more research options across medical disciplines.

Encouraged to train in research as part of the residency program, Dixit found a position in the lab of biochemistry professor William Frazier and became involved in a project on thrombospondin, a protein in the extracellular matrix. The project's success a few years later resulted in a number of publications. Congruent with his research, Dixit chose to specialize in hemostasis and thrombosis during his last year of clinical training.

In 1986 he joined the University of Michigan Medical School Department of Pathology as an assistant professor, eventually becoming a full professor. During his early years as an assistant professor, Dixit's research focused on thrombospondin. In 1994 his interests shifted and he began to reorient his research to cell death.

=== Genentech ===
In 1997, Dixit became the Director of Molecular Oncology at Genentech. In 2009 he led the Department of Physiological Chemistry. As of 2016 he held the position of Vice President of Discovery Research, and oversaw Genentech's postdoctoral program.

== Notable research discoveries ==
As one of the world's most cited scientists, some of Dixit's publications have garnered more than 2,000 citations. He was the second most highly cited scientist in the world in 1996. His lab's discovery of MyD88 (25) as a central conduit for signals emanating from the interleukin-1 receptor is considered as one of the "Pillars in Immunology" by the Journal of Immunology.

Dixit's papers, including his work on apoptosis and inflammation, have been designated "hot papers" on multiple occasions by The Scientist. This designation signifies emerging work that has a disproportionate impact on a field.

His research on apoptosis (programmed cell death) is now commonly found in introductory textbooks in both biology and medicine.

=== Early research on thrombospondin ===
While at the University of Michigan, he received funding from the National Institutes of Health to support research into thrombospondin, as his laboratory had shown this protein had a role in promoting cancer metastases.

=== Caspases and apoptosis ===
In 1991, an article in Scientific American inspired Dixit to study how tumor necrosis factors, which are responsible for the regulation of immune cells, trigger inflammation and cell death.

Dixit switched research tracks and began investigating cell death mechanisms. The research identified each component of the cell-death pathway and explained how they were all connected.

In 1996, he published the first evidence that death receptors engaged a mammalian deathase, a molecular scissors (protease) that cleaves proteins. His team's work on death receptor-induced apoptosis was notable, for prior to that time, cell surface receptors were thought to signal by functioning as ion channels or altering intracellular phosphorylation. Death receptors, however, signal by a different mechanism—activation of a death protease.

Collaborating with Guy Salvesen's group at the Burnham Institute, Dixit's group proposed the model of proximity-induced autoactivation in 1998 to explain how the first proteolytic signal is generated by caspase precursors recruited to death receptors.

=== RIP kinases, NF-κB signaling and necroptosis ===
At Genentech, Dixit formed a team with the goal of unraveling the complex interplay between cell death and inflammation at the molecular level. During his tenure, he has worked on the innate immune system, particularly its role in orchestrating an inflammatory response to fight pathogens and cancer.

In 1999, his team discovered RIPK2 and RIPK3, which later were shown to be key mediators of NF-κB signaling and necroptosis, respectively. Incorrect regulation of NF-κB has been linked to cancer, inflammatory and autoimmune diseases, and improper immune development.

Dixit's work contributed to the discovery of a core complex composed of three proteins that enabled antigen receptors to activate the canonical NF-κB pathway: CARD11, BCL10 and MALT1/paracaspase. Furthermore, he postulated a protease activity for MALT1, which plays a role in T cell activation and MALT lymphomas. His team described the family of metacaspase proteases in plants in a paper published in 2000.

In a series of papers between 2016 and 2020, Dixit and his colleagues at Genentech also worked out the complex molecular mechanisms that regulate activity of caspase-8, OTULIN, RIPK1, RIPK3 and other proteins that modulate inflammation, apoptosis and necroptosis signaling by death receptors and TLRs.

=== Inflammasomes and pyroptosis ===
By 2002, Dixit was among the first scientists to demonstrate that pro-inflammatory caspases are part of a molecular complex named inflammasomes that are integral to the proper functioning of the innate immune system. In particular, he defined regulatory components upstream of caspase-1 that proteolytically activate the pro-inflammatory cytokines interleukin-1beta and interleukin-18.

In 2004 and 2006, Dixit provided unequivocal genetic evidence by identifying the NOD-like receptors NLRP3 and NLRC4 as proximal components of inflammasomes responsible for caspase-1 activation. The research showed that inflammasomes distinguish between inflammatory triggers, such as differentiating between types of bacteria, through the use of different sensors.

More specifically, the intracellular protein NLRC4 was identified as a sensor for Salmonella that triggered assembly of an inflammasome complex. NLRP3 and the inflammasome adaptor ASC, on the other hand, were found to be required for activation of the inflammasome by diverse pathogenic agents, including microbial toxins, and Gram-positive bacteria such as Staphylococcus aureus or Listeria monocytogenes.

In 2009, his group followed up on these findings with the discovery of the first small molecule inhibitors of the NLRP3 inflammasome. Derived analogs of this sulfonylurea class of compounds are currently in clinical development for inflammatory and neurodegenerative diseases.

Dixit's team discovered the non-canonical inflammasome pathway and its critical role in mediating lethal systemic inflammation in response to Gram-negative pathogens, detailed in three papers in 2011, 2013, and 2015. This illuminated a new pathway to sepsis, a syndrome responsible for millions of deaths worldwide. Hence, targeting this pathway for therapeutic benefit is a substantial effort in pharmaceutical companies.

The 2011 paper showed that mice lacking the gene that encodes caspase-1 also carry a mutation in a neighboring caspase gene, caspase-11 (caspase-4 in humans), which is responsible for many of the effects previously attributed to caspase-1, including sensitivity to sepsis.

The 2013 paper clarified the role of Toll-like receptor 4 and caspase-11 in inducing innate immune responses to Lipopolysaccharides (LPS), a cell wall component of Gram-negative bacteria. The research showed that recognition of intracellular LPS by innate immune cells leads to a form of necrotic, proinflammatory death, termed pyroptosis. They showed that these mechanisms did not depend on TLR4, but were rather mediated by caspase-11. This was significant, because for years it was assumed that TLR4 was solely responsible for cellular responses to LPS.

In the 2015 paper, they used mice subjected to random mutation to find mediators of caspase-11-dependent non-canonical inflammasome signaling. This led to the discovery that caspase-mediated cleavage of the protein GSDMD creates a pore forming, plasma membrane disrupting amino-terminal fragment that induces pyroptosis. The advances contributed to firmly establishing the sequence of events leading from inflammasome activation to pyroptosis, DAMP release, and lethal septic shock.

Using a similar research strategy, in 2021, they reported NINJ1 to be a mediator of plasma membrane rupture and DAMP release from pyroptotic cells.

=== Ubiquitin signaling (A20, LUBAC, OTULIN) ===
In 1990, Dixit's lab at the University of Michigan discovered tumor necrosis factor (TNF)-inducible genes in endothelial cells, including A20/TNFAIP3. In later years, A20/TNFAIP3 would also achieve prominence as a modulator of inflammation.

In 2004, Dixit's group at Genentech discovered "ubiquitin editing" as a damping mechanism that attaches ubiquitin tags to TNF-receptor associated proteins to switch off pro-inflammatory signaling.

In 2018, in a similar vein, his group showed that the ubiquitin-cleaving enzyme, OTULIN, regulates cell death and inflammation by removing inhibitory linear ubiquitin chains from LUBAC, an enzyme that activates NF-κB.

== Awards and honors ==
Dixit is an elected member of the National Academy of Sciences, the National Academy of Medicine and the American Academy of Arts and Sciences.

In 2016, Dixit received the Gutenberg Research Award in Mainz, Germany. He also received the G.H.A. Clowes Memorial Award from the American Association for Cancer Research and the Dawson Prize in Genetics from Trinity College Dublin.

In 2017, he was elected Fellow of the American Association for Cancer Research. That same year, he participated in the Harvey Lecture Series, held by the Harvey Society at The Rockefeller University in New York City.

In 2018, Dixit received the Cell Death & Differentiation (CDD) Jurg Tschopp Prize at Clare College in Cambridge, United Kingdom. He has served on the boards of the Bill & Melinda Gates Foundation, Howard Hughes Medical Institute, and the Keystone Symposia on Molecular and Cellular Biology.

In 2021, he was elected Foreign Member of the Royal Society (ForMemRs).

In 2022, Dixit received the Vilcek Prize in Biomedical Science, which honors outstanding immigrant scientists for their research leadership in the United States and is awarded by the Vilcek Foundation, the Dr. A.H. Heineken Prize for Medicine for his fundamental contributions to the fields of cell death and inflammation, and the Bijvoet Medal of the Bijvoet Centre for Biomolecular Research of Utrecht University. He also received the William B. Coley Award for Distinguished Research in Basic and Tumor Immunology in 2022.
