= NHLRC2 =

Protein-coding gene in humans

Identifiers
- Aliases: NHLRC2, NHL repeat containing 2, FINCA
- External IDs: OMIM: 618277; MGI: 1914116; GeneCards: NHLRC2

Gene location (Human)
Chr.	Chromosome 10 (human)
Band	10q25.3	Start	113,854,661 bp
Band	10q25.3	End	113,917,194 bp
RNA expression pattern
Bgee	Human / Mouse (ortholog); Top expressed in: visceral pleura; Epithelium of choroid plexus; parietal pleura; Skeletal muscle tissue of rectus abdominis; seminal vesicula; lactiferous duct; tibia; germinal epithelium; skin of hip; caput epididymis / n/a; More reference expression data
BioGPS	n/a
Gene ontology
Molecular function	protein binding
Cellular component	extracellular region; platelet alpha granule lumen
Biological process	cell redox homeostasis; platelet degranulation
Sources:Amigo / QuickGO
Orthologs
Databases	NCBI: entry; OMA: entry
Species	Human	Mouse
Entrez	374354	66866
Ensembl	ENSG00000196865	n/a
UniProt	Q8NBF2	Q8BZW8
RefSeq (mRNA)	NM_198514	NM_025811
RefSeq (protein)	NP_940916	NP_080087
Location (UCSC)	Chr 10: 113.85 – 113.92 Mb	n/a
PubMed search
- Wikidata
View/Edit Human	View/Edit Mouse

NHL Repeat Containing Protein 2, or NHLRC2, is a protein encoded by the NHLRC2 gene .

== Nomenclature ==
NHLRC2 has also been referred to as Novel NHL Repeat Domain Containing Protein and 1200003F01Rik.

== Gene ==
NHLRC2 is located on the positive strand of chromosome 10, at position 10q25.3. The full gene spans 62,533 base pairs (bp). Eleven exons are transcribed in the protein-coding mRNA. There is a second, less prevalent transcript variant of NHLRC2; this non-coding isoform is 522 bp of retained intron.

== Protein ==
=== General ===
The translated NHLRC2 protein is 726 amino acids long in humans and has a molecular weight of 79,442.59 g/mol. It has been found in the cytosol, mitochondria, and/or peroxisomes of cells in which it is expressed.

=== Nhl-repeat ===
NHLRC2 is a part of the NHL-repeat superfamily of n-bladed beta-propellers. Specifically, NHLRC2 is a 6-bladed beta-propeller. The NHL repeat is found in many eukaryotic and prokaryotic proteins, and is associated with growth factor regulators.

== Function ==
The function of NHLRC2 is not yet fully understood. Using bioinformatic analysis, a "YVAD" motif was found to be conserved in eukaryotes, bacteria, and archaea. "YVAD" shows up three times alone in the human NHLRC2 protein. This motif is potentially involved in inhibiting caspases 1, 2, 3, 4 & 5, thus possibly having anti-apoptotic properties.

== Expression ==
=== Normal expression ===
According to NCBI GEO microarray expression patterns, as well as UniGene's Expressed Sequence Tag (EST) profiles, NHLRC2 is expressed at low levels throughout most human tissues.

=== Conditional expression ===
NCBI GEO Profiles detailed several conditions under which NHLRC2 expression is increased in comparison to base expression levels. Many, but not all, conditional cases involved an increase of NHLRC2 expression in various cancer types, including—but not limited to—the following: leukemia, lymphomas, breast & mammary gland cancer, colorectal cancer, Wilms' tumor, and lung cancer.

== Homology ==
NHLRC2 has no human paralogs. Extensive orthologs were identified, however, using NCBI's BLAST and BLAT programs. A select group of orthologs are detailed in the table below. This is not an exhaustive list of orthologs; rather, it shows the diversity of NHLRC2 orthologs.

== Predicted post-translational modification ==
PSORT II predicted one possible cleavage site within NHLRC2 in humans: between amino aids 32Q and 33E. PSORT II also predicted two possible vacuolar signaling motifs—KLPK and TLPK—in humans that were also conserved in close orthologs such as vertebrates and amphibians, but not in distant orthologs like insects or plants.
