= Miriam Moffatt =

British scientist and academic

Miriam Moffatt FRSB MAE
- Born: Miriam Fleur Moffatt
- Education: University of Reading (BSc); University of Oxford (DPhil)
- Scientific career
- Workplaces: University of Oxford; Imperial College London
- Thesis: Genetic studies of atopy (1993)
- Doctoral advisor: William Cookson; Julian Hopkin
- Website: profiles.imperial.ac.uk/m.moffatt

Miriam Fleur Moffatt FRSB MAE is a British scientist who is a professor of respiratory genetics at Imperial College London. She serves as the deputy director of the National Centre for Mesothelioma Research where her research investigates the genetics of asthma, thoraic cancers and atopic dermatitis.

== Early life and education ==
Moffatt studied microbiology at the University of Reading. She moved to the University of Oxford, where she worked on the genetics of asthma, and was awarded a PhD in 1993 for genetic analysis of atopy.

== Research and career ==
After her PhD, she was awarded a Junior Research Fellowship at Green Templeton College, Oxford. Moffatt started her academic career on the faculty at the University of Oxford. She was made a research lecturer, and eventually a Reader in Genetics. At Oxford, she led the first microsatellite screen for asthma associated traits. She moved to Imperial College London in 2005, where she joined the National Heart and Lung Institute. She was named a Personal Chair in Respiratory Genetics in 2008. Her research looks to understand why certain people are predisposed to asthma and atopic dermatitis. She develops candidate gene approaches to genome-wide association studies (GWAS).

A Moffatt GWAS of childhood asthma identified Ormdl sphingolipid biosynthesis regulator 3, an asthma predisposition locus on chromosome 17q12. This locus has the strongest genetic association with childhood asthma, and makes children susceptible to asthma exacerbations. She conducted a 26,000 person GWAS in seventeen countries, which showed that variants at the ORMDL3/GSDMB locus were associated with childhood-onset disease.

Moffatt looks to design diagnostic tools that use DNA sequencing to understand lung bacteria, then identify antibiotics that target specific bacteria (so-called narrow-spectrum antibiotics).

=== Selected publications ===
Her publications include:

- Genetic studies of body mass index yield new insights for obesity biology
- Association analyses of 249,796 individuals reveal 18 new loci associated with body mass index
- Reagent and laboratory contamination can critically impact sequence-based microbiome analyses

=== Awards and honours ===
Moffatt was elected Fellow of the Royal Society of Biology (FRSB) and the Member of the Academia Europaea (MAE) in 2020.
