= TENM3 =

Protein-coding gene in the species Homo sapiens

Identifiers
- Aliases: TENM3, MCOPCB9, ODZ3, TNM3, Ten-m3, ten-3, teneurin transmembrane protein 3, MCOPS15, TEN3
- External IDs: OMIM: 610083; MGI: 1345183; GeneCards: TENM3

Gene location (Human)
| Chr. | Chromosome 4 (human) |
| Band | 4q34.3-q35.1 | Start | 182,143,987 bp |
| Band | 4q34.3-q35.1 | End | 182,803,024 bp |

Gene location (Mouse)
| Chr. | Chromosome 8 (mouse) |
| Band | 8|8 B1.1-B1.2 | Start | 48,227,682 bp |
| Band | 8|8 B1.1-B1.2 | End | 48,843,951 bp |
RNA expression pattern
| Bgee | Human / Mouse (ortholog); Top expressed in: sural nerve; stromal cell of endometrium; Achilles tendon; testicle; islet of Langerhans; placenta; cartilage tissue; gonad; internal globus pallidus; entorhinal cortex / Top expressed in: pineal gland; genital tubercle; calvaria; vas deferens; epithelium of lens; tail of embryo; human fetus; efferent ductule; abdominal wall; migratory enteric neural crest cell; More reference expression data |
| BioGPS | n/a |
Gene ontology
| Molecular function | protein homodimerization activity; protein heterodimerization activity; cell adhesion molecule binding |
| Cellular component | integral component of membrane; axon; cell projection; membrane; neuron projection; integral component of plasma membrane; plasma membrane |
| Biological process | cell differentiation; self proteolysis; cell adhesion; camera-type eye morphogenesis; signal transduction; homophilic cell adhesion via plasma membrane adhesion molecules; positive regulation of neuron projection development; cell morphogenesis; heterophilic cell-cell adhesion via plasma membrane cell adhesion molecules; neuron development; regulation of homophilic cell adhesion |
Sources:Amigo / QuickGO
Orthologs
| Databases | NCBI: entry; OMA: entry |
| Species | Human | Mouse |
| Entrez | 55714 | 23965 |
| Ensembl | ENSG00000218336 | ENSMUSG00000031561 |
| UniProt | Q9P273 | Q9WTS6 |
| RefSeq (mRNA) | NM_001080477 | NM_001145937; NM_011857 |
| RefSeq (protein) | NP_001073946 | n/a |
| Location (UCSC) | Chr 4: 182.14 – 182.8 Mb | Chr 8: 48.23 – 48.84 Mb |
| PubMed search |
- Wikidata
| View/Edit Human | View/Edit Mouse |

Teneurin-3, also known as Ten-m3, Odz3, Ten-m/Odz3, Tenascin-like molecule major 3 or Teneurin transmembrane protein 3, is a protein that, in humans, is encoded by the TENM3, or ODZ3, gene. Ten-m3 is a ~300 kDa type II transmembrane glycoprotein that is a member of the teneurin/Ten-m/Odz family. The teneurin family currently consists of four members: Ten-m1-Ten-m4. Ten-ms are conserved across both vertebrate and invertebrate species. They are expressed in distinct, but often interconnected, areas of the developing nervous system and in some non-neural tissues. Like the Ten-m family, Ten-m3 plays a critical role in regulating connectivity of the nervous system, particularly in axon pathfinding and synaptic organisation in the motor and visual system. Mutation in the TENM3/ODZ3 gene in humans has been associated with the eye condition, microphthalmia.

== History ==
Teneurin protein was first identified and characterised in Drosophila by Baumgartner and Chiquet-Ehrismann in early 1990s. They were looking for the invertebrate homologue of the extracellular matrix glycoprotein tenascin-C to learn more about its structure and function. The embryonic Drosophila cDNA library was screened using polymerase chain reaction (PCR) and a primer derived from the EGF-like repeats region of chicken tenascin-C protein. Two novel molecules containing similar tenascin-like repeats were identified, which were named Ten-a for "tenascin-like molecule accessory" and Ten-m for "tenascin-like molecule major". Around the same time, Levine et al. also identified Ten-m in Drosophila by screening for tyrosine phosphorylation on cDNA using monoclonal antibodies. However, they named this gene odd Oz (Odz) after the oddless pair-rule phenotype displayed in Odz mutant embryos, where every odd-numbered body segment was deleted. Since discovery of teneurins in Drosophila, many other laboratories have independently described the Ten-a and Ten-m/Odz homolog proteins in different vertebrates. However, various names were assigned to these vertebrate homologs, which complicated the nomenclature of teneurin proteins. The proteins were called Ten-ms in zebrafish, teneurins in chicken, Ten-m1-4, Odz1-4, Ten-m/Odz1-4, DOC4 in mouse, neurestin in rat, and teneurin or Odz in human. The name teneurin was coined by Minet et al. in 1999 from the original name, Ten-a, and the major site of the protein expression being in the nervous system.

== Structure ==
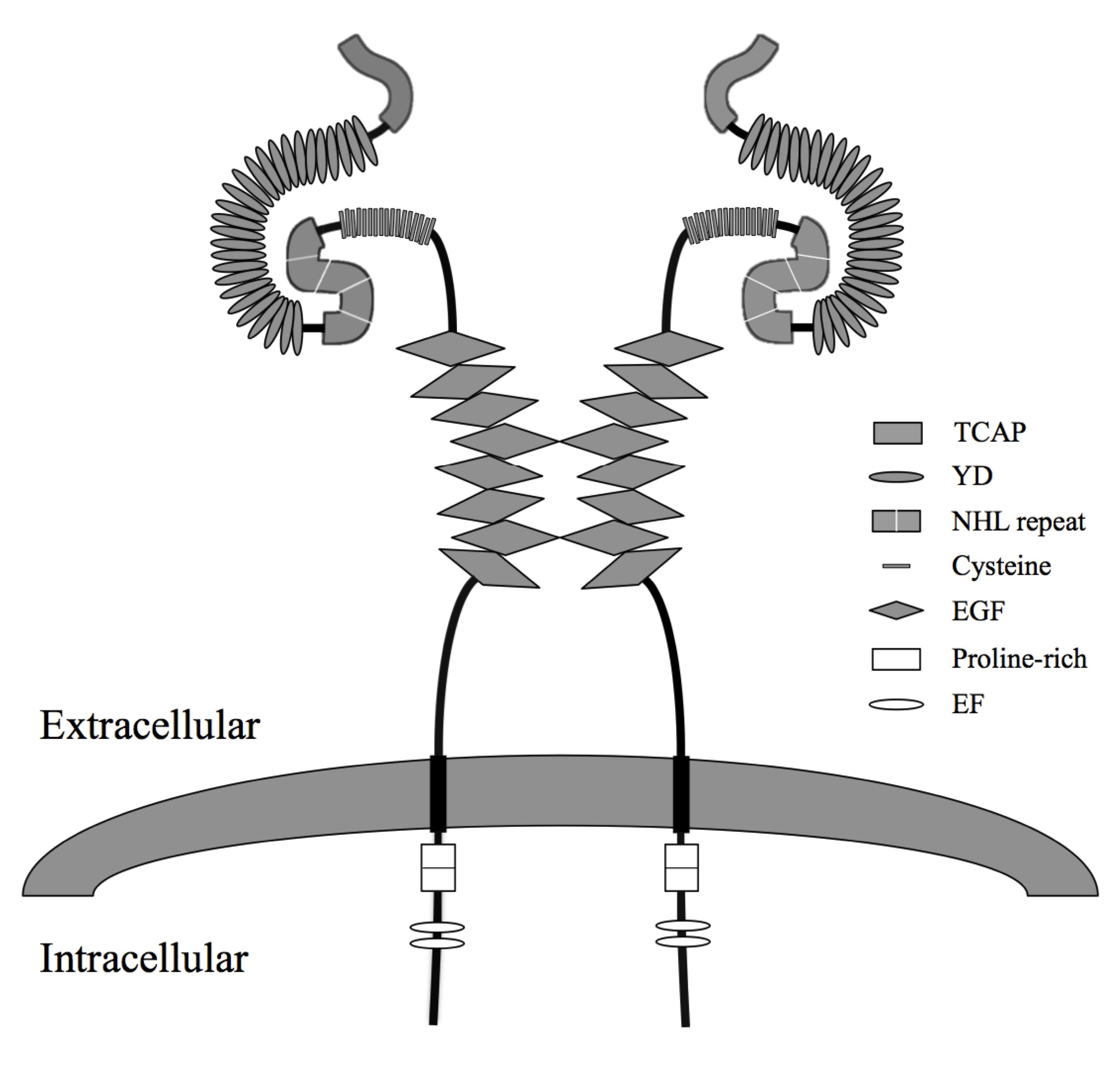
Schematic diagram of the hypothesised structure of a pair of dimerised mouse teneurin molecules. The extracellular domain of the teneurin protein consists of a linker region, a region of EGF-like repeats with a cysteine on the second and fifth repeats for dimerisation, and a globular domain. The globular domain consists of a cysteine-rich region, five NHL repeats, 26 YD repeats and the TCAP. The intracellular domain consists of two polyproline domains, two EF-hand-like motifs and tyrosine phosphorylation sites. Adapted from.

Like the Ten-m family, Ten-m3 is a large type II transmembrane glycoprotein that has a molecular weight of ~300 kDa and is composed of ~2800 amino acids. Teneurins are highly conserved within and between species. The primary structure, or amino acid sequence identity, of the proteins between paralogs is ~60% identical and between orthologs is ~90%, whilst between vertebrates and Drosophila or C. elegans is only 33-41% identical. All teneurins, especially in mouse, are type II transmembrane proteins that are composed of a large extracellular C terminal domain of ~2400 amino acid residues, a single transmembrane helical domain of ~30 hydrophobic residues and an intracellular N terminal domain of ~300-375 residues. The extracellular domain of the molecule can undergo dimerisation.

=== Extracellular domain ===
The extracellular C terminal domain is composed of a linker region, EGF-like repeats and then a globular domain. The linker region is made up of ~200 amino acid residues and is found immediately distal to the transmembrane domain. This is followed by eight phylogenetically conserved tenascin C-type EGF-like repeats, which features the uniquely conserved replacement of a single cysteine in repeats 2 and 5 in place of the original tyrosine and phenylalanine residues respectively. Since cysteines are susceptible to forming disulfide bonds, the single cysteines at the EGF-like repeats of a teneurin molecule can facilitate the homophilic and heterophilic dimerisation of teneurin family molecules. More distally is the globular domain consisting of a 700-800 amino acid residue region. There are 17 conserved cysteine residues, a region of NHL repeats, a region of 26 YD residue repeats, and then a teneurin C-associated peptide (TCAP). The YD repeats are rich in N-linked glycosylation and were previously only reported in the rhs element of bacteria. The TCAP is the resulting peptide from cleaving a putative furin cleavage site found immediately on the N-terminal of TCAP. The furin cleavage site is rich in tyrosine residues and consists of 4 conserved cysteine residues. The 4 cysteine residues assist in protein folding, however, they are absent in Ten-m2 and Ten-m3. There are 41 amino acids in TCAPs, except for TCAP-3 from Ten-m3, which has 40. TCAPs show structural homology to the CRF family molecule and appears to influence neurite outgrowth and some behaviours relating to stress and anxiety.

=== Intracellular domain ===
The N terminal intracellular domain (ICD) consists of two proline-rich regions in the half closest to the transmembrane domain, two EF-hand-like motifs near the centre, and a number of conserved tyrosine phosphorylation sites. The proline-rich stretches are typical binding sites for SH3 proteins, which can regulate intracellular teneurin signalling pathway.

== Interactions ==
Teneurins are homophilic adhesion molecules that bind specifically to other teneurin-family molecules on adjacent cells. The NHL domain on the extracellular domain of teneurins acts as a homophilic recognition site to mediate this specific binding. This interaction facilitates neurite outgrowth and the adhesion strength needed to stop outgrowth. The dimerisation of the extracellular domains of teneurin molecules can lead to the proteolytic cleavage of the ICD. A weak nuclear localisation signal in the ICD of Ten-m3 facilitates the translocation of the ICD into the nucleus. TCAPs from the extracellular domain of a teneurin molecule can form an intercellular adhesive complex when bound to the adhesion family G-protein coupled receptor latrophilin, which is involved in gamete migration and gonadal morphology.

== Expression ==
Teneurin molecules are prominently expressed in distinctive, but often overlapping, populations of neurons, especially during embryonic development. They are also expressed in some non-neuronal tissues that regulate pattern formation and sites of cell migration. Some Ten-m3 expressions can occur in a high-to-low gradient.

=== Embryonic expression ===
At day 7.5 in mouse embryonic development (E7.5), in situ hybridisation shows Ten-m3 mRNA expression at the neural plate, particularly in the neural folds. At E8.5, Ten-m3 is expressed at the caudal forebrain, the midbrain region and structures outside of the CNS, including the pharyngeal arches and the otic vesicles. At E9.5 and 10.5, Ten-m3 expression extends from the telencephalon to the midbrain and also at the pharyngeal arches, otic vesicles, anterior somites and the limb buds. Between these stages, Ten-m3 and Ten-m4 are expressed in complementary patterns in the brain, suggesting a complementary function during development. At E12.5, Ten-m3 is higher in the midbrain compared to the caudal diencephalon and the spinal cord. It is also co-expressed with Ten-m4 in the first, second and third pharyngeal arches. At E15.5, Ten-m3 is expressed in the forebrain and facial mesenchyme, but absent from the mid- and hindbrain. It is also expressed in the developing whisker pads in mouse.

=== Adult expression ===
In a 6-week-old adult mouse, Ten-m3 is co-expressed with the other three Ten-m mRNAs at the granular layer of the dentate gyrus and the stratum pyramidale of the hippocampus. It is expressed relatively weakly in the granular layer and in the stratum lacunosum moleculare, but is strongly expressed in the CA2 subfield and weakly in the CA1 subfield of the hippocampus. However, immunostaining of Ten-m3 shows weak protein expression throughout the hippocampus except for the stratum lacunosum moleculare. Ten-m3 mRNA is prominently co-expressed with Ten-m2 and Ten-m4 in the Purkinje's cell zone of the cerebellum. Ten-m3 protein is expressed in the Purkinje's cell zone, molecular and granular layers and the white matter of the cerebellum. All Ten-m mRNAs are expressed prominently between layers II and VI of the cerebrum.

=== Gradient expression ===
The Ten-m3 gene, along with Ten-m2 and Ten-m4, is expressed throughout the neocortex in a low rostral to high caudal and a high dorsal-medial to low ventral-lateral gradient from E15.5 to P2. In E17 mouse, Ten-m3 mRNA is expressed in the parafascicular thalamic nucleus, a subregion of the thalamus, and in the striatum in a high dorsal-caudal to low ventral-rostral gradient. Patches of this expression can still be observed in first week postnatal mice. Similarly, there is a graded expression of Ten-m3 in the visual pathway, especially during embryonic and early postnatal development. Expression is highest in the dorsal lateral geniculate nucleus (dLGN) and superior colliculus in the region that corresponds topographically to ventral retina.

== Function ==
=== Motor skill acquisition ===
Ten-m3 plays an important role during early development in directing the topographic neural projection and formation of the thalamostriatal circuitry, thus critical for motor skill acquisition. Ten-m3 molecule is the first to be reported to regulate connectivity in the thalamostriatal pathway. Ten-m3 guides some of the axon projections from dorsal regions of the parafascicular nucleus (PF) of the thalamus to dorsal regions of the striatum. This creates a high dorsal to low ventral gradient topography mapping between the two structures. In Ten-m3 null mutant mice, these projections are diffuse and project ectopically to more ventral and medial regions in the striatum. Furthermore, the null mutant mice display delayed motor skill acquisition in the accelerating rotorod task.

=== Binocular vision ===
In in vivo vertebrate studies, Ten-m3 acts as an eye-specific guidance molecule during early development. Functional binocular vision requires the correct projection of ipsilateral axons from the retina to the dorsal lateral geniculate nucleus (dLGN) and primary visual cortex (V1) and to the superior colliculus (SC). Ten-m3 facilitates the retinotopic mapping of ipsilateral axons from the ventrotemporal retinal ganglion cells, which encode visual input from the binocular visual field, to the dorsomedial dLGN and to the rostromedial SC. Immunostaining reveals a cluster of high Ten-m3 protein expression in the areas involved in this ipsilateral mapping. In Ten-m3 null mutant mice, these projections are reduced and ectopic projections are expanded ventrolaterally along the dLGN and caudomedially in the SC from both eyes. The aberrant misalignment of ipsilateral axons from both eyes result in binocular vision deficits. Ten-m3 null mutant mice performed worse than wild type (WT) in behavioural tests of binocular visual function, such as vertical placement and visual cliff test. However, inactivation of inputs from one eye (i.e. inactivate binocular vision) restored visual behaviour to a level similar to WT mice under binocular condition.

=== Teneurin C-Associated Peptide functions ===
The peptide cleaved from the C terminal of Ten-m3, TCAP-3, stimulates the production of cAMP and the proliferation of neurons. It can increase the expression of its gene at high concentrations but attenuate the expression at low concentrations. TCAP-1 from Ten-m1, another member of the Ten-m family, modulates stress and anxiety behaviours. TCAP-1 increases the acoustic startle response in a low-anxiety rat but decreases the response in a high anxiety rat when injected into the basolateral amygdala. It also inhibits the sensitisation of the response when injected into the lateral ventricles.

== Disease Linkage ==
A case study reports a family with autosomal recessive colobomatous microphthalmia in two children of third-cousin parents. This developmental condition results in small-sized eyes and is associated with coloboma. PCR analysis identified the homozygous null mutation to be in the ODZ3 gene, which is important for the early developing eye.
