= William Cookson (physician) =

British physician and geneticist (born 1951)

William Osmond Charles Cookson
- Born: August 1, 1951 (age 75); London, England
- Citizenship: British
- Education: University of Western Australia, University of Oxford
- Known for: Research on asthma genetics and respiratory microbiome
- Awards: Fellow of the Academy of Medical Sciences; Fellow of the Royal College of Physicians
- Scientific career
- Fields: Genomic medicine
- Workplaces: Imperial College London, University of Oxford

William Osmond Charles Cookson (born 1 August 1951) is a British physician and geneticist who is Professor of Genomic medicine at Imperial College London.

He was elected a Fellow of the Academy of Medical Sciences in 1999 and a Fellow of the Royal College of Physicians in 2000.

== Early life and education ==
Cookson was born in London, England. His parents were Laurence Cookson, a pathologist, and Patricia Cookson (née Brazier). He was educated in Zimbabwe and Australia and studied medicine at the University of Western Australia, graduating with a Bachelor of Medicine, Bachelor of Surgery in 1975.

He trained in internal medicine and was elected a Fellow of the Royal Australasian College of Physicians in 1985. He received an MD from the University of Western Australia in 1986 for research on asbestosis and malignant mesothelioma among miners at Wittenoom.

After returning to the United Kingdom in 1984, Cookson undertook research at the University of Oxford. He received a DPhil in genetics in 1994 and an Oxford MA in 1996. He became a Fellow of the Royal College of Physicians in 2000.

== Career ==
Cookson joined the University of Oxford in 1984 as a research fellow in the Osler Chest Unit. He held an Asthma Research Council Research Fellowship from 1987 to 1989 and a Wellcome Trust Senior Clinical Research Fellowship from 1989 to 2004.

From 1998 to 2004, he was Professor of Human Genetics at the Wellcome Trust Centre for Human Genetics at Oxford.

In 2004, Cookson joined Imperial College London as Professor of Genomic Medicine in the National Heart and Lung Institute. He served as Head of Respiratory Sciences from 2008 to 2016. He became Head of the Asmarley Centre for Genomic Medicine in 2014 and Head of the National Centre for Mesothelioma Research in 2017.

== Research ==
Cookson's research has examined the genetic basis of asthma and allergic disease. His work with Julian Hopkin contributed to research into associations between genetic variation and atopic disease.

Cookson was involved in the GABRIEL consortium, a European research collaboration investigating genetic and environmental factors associated with asthma. The consortium conducted genome-wide association studies and reported genetic variants associated with asthma.

His research has also examined relationships between genetic variation and gene expression in asthma and other respiratory diseases, including studies of genes such as ORMDL3, IL33, TSLP and IL1RL1.

Another area of his research has been the human microbiome, particularly microorganisms in the respiratory tract. Cookson and collaborators examined microbial communities in the airways of healthy people and patients with respiratory diseases including asthma and chronic obstructive pulmonary disease.

== Honours ==
Cookson was elected a Fellow of the Academy of Medical Sciences in 1999 and a Fellow of the Royal College of Physicians in 2000. He was elected a member of the European Academy of Sciences and Arts in 2024.

He was a Governing Body Fellow of Green College, Oxford, from 1993 to 2003 and served as its Dean from 1998 to 2003.

Cookson was a National Institute for Health Research Senior Investigator from 2012 to 2015. In 2011, he and Miriam Moffatt received a joint Wellcome Senior Investigator Award.
