= William Cookson =

William Cookson may refer to:

- William Cookson (poet)
- William Cookson (cricketer)
- William Cookson (physician)
- William Cookson (priest)
- Bill Cookson, Australian rules footballer
