= Teneurin =

Identifiers
- Symbol: Teneurin
- Pfam: PF06484
- InterPro: IPR009471
- Membranome: 1168
Available protein structures:
- PDB: IPR009471 PF06484 (ECOD; PDBsum)
- AlphaFold: IPR009471; PF06484

Teneurins are a family of phylogenetically conserved single-pass transmembrane glycoproteins expressed during pattern formation and morphogenesis. The name refers to "ten-a" (from "tenascin-like protein, accessory") and "neurons", the primary site of teneurin expression. Ten-m refers to tenascin-like protein major.

Teneurins are highly conserved between Drosophila, C. elegans and vertebrates. In each species, they are expressed by a subset of neurons as well as at sites of pattern formation and morphogenesis. In Drosophila, a teneurin known as ten-m or Odz is a pair-rule gene, and its expression is required for normal development. The knockdown of teneurin (ten-1) expression in C. elegans with RNAi leads to abnormal neuronal pathfinding and abnormal development of the gonads.

The intracellular domain of some, if not all, teneurins can be cleaved and transported to the cell nucleus, where it proposed to act as a transcription factor. A peptide derived from the terminus of the extracellular domain shares structural homology with certain neuropeptides.

There are four teneurin genes in vertebrates, named teneurin-1 through -4. Other names found in the literature include Odz-1 through -4 and Tenm-1 through -4.

== History ==
Originally discovered as ten-m and ten-a in Drosophila melanogaster, the teneurin family is conserved from Caenorhabditis elegans (ten-1) to vertebrates, in which four paralogs exist (teneurin-1 to -4 or odz-1 to -4). Their distinct protein domain architecture is highly conserved between invertebrate and vertebrate teneurins, particularly in the extracellular part. The intracellular domains of Ten-a, Ten-m/Odz and C. elegans TEN-1 are significantly different, both in size and structure, from the comparable domains of vertebrate teneurins, but the extracellular domains of all of these proteins are remarkably similar.

== Function ==
Teneurins translocate to the nucleus where they regulate transcriptional activity. Teneurins promote neurite outgrowth and cell adhesion. The intracellular domain interacts with the DNA-binding transcriptional repressors and also regulate the activity of transcription factors.

Additionally, they have been known to interact with the cytoskeleton adaptor protein, CAP/ponsin, suggesting cell signalling roles and regulation of actin organisation.

Teneurin-3 regulates the structural and functional wiring of retinal ganglion cells in the vertebrate visual system.

== Structure ==
Ten-m1–4, exist as homodimers and undergo homophilic interactions in vertebrates.

=== C terminal domain ===
The large C-terminal extracellular domain consists of eight EGF-like repeats (see PROSITEDOC), a region of conserved cysteines and unique YD-repeats.

=== N terminal domain ===
Teneurin Intracellular Region

Identifiers
- Symbol: Ten_N
- Pfam: PF06484
- InterPro: IPR009471
Available protein structures:
- PDB: IPR009471 PF06484 (ECOD; PDBsum)
- AlphaFold: IPR009471; PF06484

The teneurin intracellular (IC) domain (~300–400 aa) is located at the N-terminus and contains a number of conserved putative tyrosine phosphorylation sites, two EF-hand-like calcium-binding motifs, and two polyproline domains. These proline-rich stretches are characteristic of SH3-binding sites. There is considerable divergence between intracellular domains of invertebrate and vertebrate teneurins as well as between different invertebrate proteins.

This domain is found in the intracellular N-terminal region of the teneurin family.

== Human genes ==
Human genes encoding proteins that concontain the teneurin domain include:

- TENM1
- TENM2
- TENM3
- TENM4
