= Ysgol Maesydderwen =

Location
- Tudor Street; Ystradgynlais, SA9 1AP; Wales
- Coordinates: 51.7689°N 3.7691°W

Information
- Type: Mixed, comprehensive
- Motto: Working Together, Achieving More - Cydweithio a Chyflawni
- Established: 1907
- Local authority: Powys
- Head teacher: Phil Grimes
- Gender: Mixed
- Age: 11 to 18
- Website: www.ysgolmaesydderwen.co.uk

Ysgol Maesydderwen is a state secondary school and sixth form in Ystradgynlais, Powys. As of 2024, there were 542 pupils on roll at the school. It is an English-medium school.

== History ==
The school has its origins in Ystradgynlais County School which was established in 1907, moving into the former Maesydderwen Mansion in 1911. This school was destroyed by fire in 1932 and a new school built in its place, reopening in 1934. Additional extensions to the school were completed in 1954.

The newest section of the school is a two-storey block, opened to pupils in September 2012 and officially opened in May 2013. This block also incorporates a gymnasium and sports hall forming part of Ystradgynlais Sports Centre.

== Performance ==
The school was rated a mix of "good" and "adequate" in a 2017 Estyn report and amber in the 2019 national school categorization. In 2021 Estyn reported that the school had been removed from the list of schools requiring Estyn review, deeming it to have made sufficient progress in addressing the recommendations made in the 2017 inspection.

In 2017, 9 per cent of pupils spoke Welsh at home.

== Notable former pupils ==
- Jane Aspell, neuroscientist
- Vernon Cooper, rugby player
- Richard Corgan, actor
- Alun Donovan, rugby player
- Julian Hopkin, physician, researcher and medical teacher
- Kevin Hopkins, rugby player
- Jeff Hughes, historian
- Adam Jones, rugby player
- Steven Meo, actor
- Eve Myles, actress
- Craig Russell, actor
