= Julian Hopkin =

Julian Hopkin CBE FRCP FMedSci FLSW
- Born: Julian Meurglyn Hopkin; August 30, 1948 (age 77); Ystradgynlais
- Education: Ysgol Maesydderwen
- Alma mater: Welsh National School of Medicine
- Awards: Daiwa-Adrian Prize (2001)
- Scientific career
- Fields: Medicine
- Institutions: Swansea University; University of Oxford; University of Edinburgh
- Notable students: Miriam Moffatt

Julian Meurglyn Hopkin CBE FRCP FMedSci FLSW (born 1948) is a physician, researcher and medical teacher. In 2004, he became the founding head of the new Medical School at Swansea University. He is now Professor of Experimental Medicine at Swansea University Medical School and Honorary Physician at the Abertawe-Bro-Morgannwg (ABM) University Hospital. He was appointed a CBE in 2011 for his services to medicine.

== Education and early life ==
Born in Ystradgynlais, Wales, Hopkin attended Maesydderwen School before proceeding to the Welsh National School of Medicine in Cardiff, graduating with a Bachelor of Medicine (BM) degree in 1972. Hopkin proceeded with his postgraduate clinical training in Cardiff, Oxford and Edinburgh, including a period with John Crofton, the initiator of successful combination chemotherapy for tuberculosis. Hopkin undertook scientific training (Master and Doctorate) at the University of Edinburgh and MRC Human Genetics Unit).

== Career and research ==
In Edinburgh, with John Evans, he described the potent mutagenic actions of cigarette smoke on human cells - going on to quantify the mutagenic and cytotoxic actions of cigarette smoke and their relationship to lung cancer and pulmonary emphysema risks respectively.

Hopkin spent periods in pulmonary medicine practice, in medical student teaching (Fellow and Supervisor of clinical students at Brasenose College, Oxford, 1992–99), and in research at Birmingham and Oxford. In those periods he developed a robust bronchoscopic lavage method to secure precise microbial diagnostics and improved survivals for pneumonia in immuno-suppressed subjects. With Anne Wakefield, he settled the fungal taxonomic status of the important opportunistic pathogen, pneumocystis, and devised a precise mitochondrial rRNA diagnostic for pneumocystis pneumonia, applicable to simple non-invasive simple clinical samples and adopted worldwide.

With the rise in asthma prevalence (1980–2000), Hopkin undertook collaborative work addressing the underlying causes. He showed that common up-regulating genetic variants of Th2 immune signalling related to allergic disorder and high IgE levels (sharing, with Taro Shirakawa, the 2001 Daiwa-Adrian Prize in Medicine) but also to low burdens of parasitic work infestation - proposing an evolutionary mechanism in which prevalent parasitic worm infection has provided long term evolutionary selection for up-regulating genetic variants of Th-2 immunity. He contributed epidemiologic data that relate diminished bacterial exposures in early childhood (less tuberculosis; more oral antibiotic receipts) to increased allergic disorder. His current work builds on the latter and focuses on how bacterial exposures shape human immunity relevant to asthma, and how unravelling these microbial mechanisms may provide disease preventing agents.

=== Awards and honors ===
- Fellow of the Academy of Medical Sciences (FMedSci, 2005)
- Fellow of the Learned Society of Wales (FLSW, 2011)
- Appointed Commander of the British Empire, (CBE) – for services to Medicine (2011)
