= Copper type II ascorbate-dependent monooxygenase =

Class of enzymes

Copper type II ascorbate-dependent monooxygenase, N-terminal domain
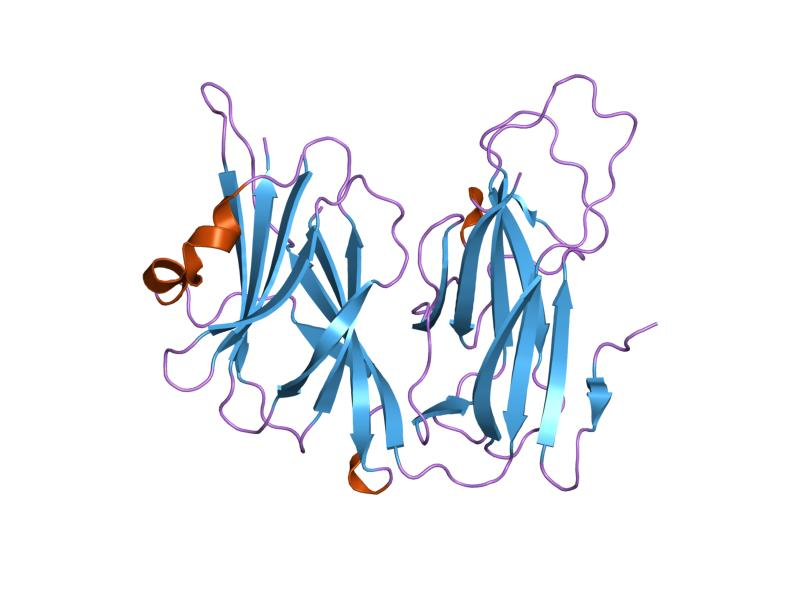
- reduced peptidylglycine alpha-hydroxylating monooxygenase in a new crystal form

Identifiers
- Symbol: Cu2_monooxygen
- Pfam: PF01082
- InterPro: IPR000323
- PROSITE: PDOC00080
- SCOP2: 1phm / SCOPe / SUPFAM
Available protein structures:
- PDB: IPR000323 PF01082 (ECOD; PDBsum)
- AlphaFold: IPR000323; PF01082

Copper type II ascorbate-dependent monooxygenase, C-terminal domain
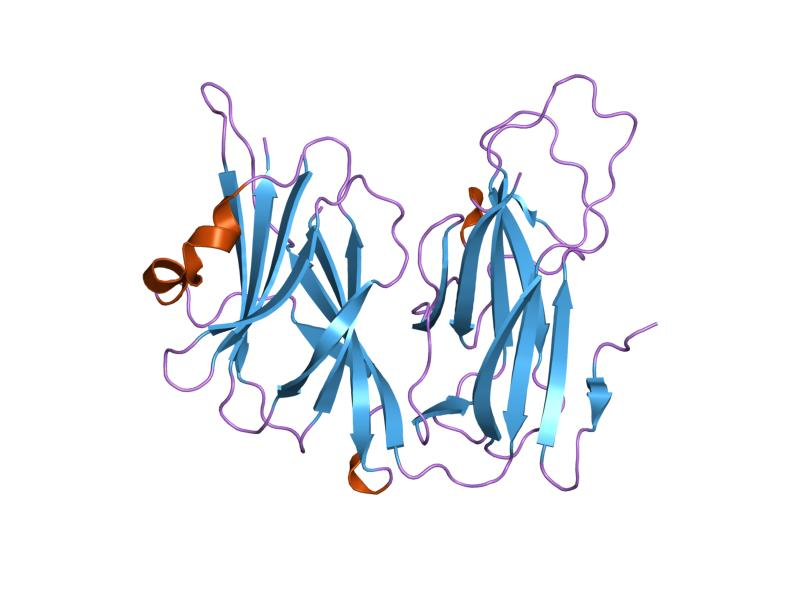
- reduced peptidylglycine alpha-hydroxylating monooxygenase in a new crystal form

Identifiers
- Symbol: Cu2_monoox_C
- Pfam: PF03712
- PROSITE: PDOC00080
- SCOP2: 1phm / SCOPe / SUPFAM
Available protein structures:
- PDB: PF03712 (ECOD; PDBsum)
- AlphaFold: PF03712

In molecular biology, the copper type II ascorbate-dependent monooxygenases are a class of enzymes that require copper as a cofactor and which use ascorbate as an electron donor. This family contains two related enzymes, dopamine beta-monooxygenase EC 1.14.17.1 and peptidylglycine alpha-amidating monooxygenase EC 1.14.17.3. There are a few regions of sequence similarities between these two enzymes, two of these regions contain clusters of conserved histidine residues which are most probably involved in binding copper.
