= ORMDL sphingolipid biosynthesis regulator 3 =

Protein-coding gene in the species Homo sapiens

ORMDL3

Identifiers
- Aliases: ORMDL3, ORMDL sphingolipid biosynthesis regulator 3
- External IDs: OMIM: 610075; MGI: 1913862; GeneCards: ORMDL3

Gene location (Human)
Chr.	Chromosome 17 (human)
Band	17q21.1	Start	39,921,041 bp
Band	17q21.1	End	39,927,601 bp

Gene location (Mouse)
Chr.	Chromosome 11 (mouse)
Band	11|11 D	Start	98,472,082 bp
Band	11|11 D	End	98,478,194 bp
RNA expression pattern
Bgee	Human / Mouse (ortholog); Top expressed in: right lobe of liver; bone marrow cell; granulocyte; stromal cell of endometrium; body of pancreas; epithelium of colon; anterior pituitary; olfactory zone of nasal mucosa; abdominal fat; apex of heart / Top expressed in: olfactory epithelium; brown adipose tissue; saccule; white adipose tissue; lactiferous gland; lip; epithelium of small intestine; choroid plexus of fourth ventricle; tunica adventitia of aorta; neural layer of retina; More reference expression data
BioGPS	n/a
Gene ontology
Molecular function	protein binding
Cellular component	integral component of membrane; SPOTS complex; endoplasmic reticulum membrane; endoplasmic reticulum; membrane; plasma membrane; secretory granule membrane; specific granule membrane
Biological process	ceramide metabolic process; cellular sphingolipid homeostasis; neutrophil degranulation; negative regulation of ceramide biosynthetic process
Sources:Amigo / QuickGO
Orthologs
Databases	NCBI: entry; OMA: entry
Species	Human	Mouse
Entrez	94103	66612
Ensembl	ENSG00000172057	ENSMUSG00000038150
UniProt	Q8N138	Q9CPZ6
RefSeq (mRNA)	NM_139280; NM_001320801; NM_001320802; NM_001320803; NM_016471	NM_025661
RefSeq (protein)	NP_001307730; NP_001307731; NP_001307732; NP_644809	NP_079937
Location (UCSC)	Chr 17: 39.92 – 39.93 Mb	Chr 11: 98.47 – 98.48 Mb
PubMed search
- Wikidata
View/Edit Human	View/Edit Mouse

ORMDL sphingolipid biosynthesis regulator 3 is a protein that in humans is encoded by the ORMDL3 gene. Variants affecting the expression of this gene are associated with asthma in childhood. Transgenic mice which overexpress human ORMDL3 have increased levels of IgE. This correlated with increased numbers of macrophages, neutrophils, eosinophils, CD4^{+} and enhanced Th2 cytokine levels in the lung tissue.

== Localisation ==
The ORMDL family, whose name stands for ORM1 (Saccharomyces cerevisiae)–like genes, consists of three members (ORMDL1-3) which are localised in the membrane of the endoplasmic reticulum (ER). All three human ORMDL genes encode 153 amino acid products. The genes ORMDL1, ORMDL2 and ORMDL3 are located on human chromosomes 2q32, 12q13.2 and 17q21, respectively.

== Function ==
ORMDL3 negatively regulates de novo sphingolipid synthesis through interaction with serine palmitoyltransferase (SPT), but it may be present in relative excess of SPT physiologically, as ORMDL3 overexpression does not significantly reduce cellular sphingolipid biosynthesis. ORMDL3 also has a role in regulating Ca^{2+} levels in the endoplasmic reticulum. The ER is very important for generation, signaling function and storage of intracellular Ca^{2+}. There are channels, which control the exit of Ca^{2+} from the ER into the cytoplasm and also pumps (sarco-endoplasmic reticulum Ca^{2+} ATPase or SERCA) which return Ca^{2+} back to the ER. Dysregulation of Ca^{2+} has the key role in several pathological conditions like dysfunction of SERCA, asthma, and Alzheimer's.

== Clinical significance ==
Mutations in ORMDL3 are associated with inflammatory diseases like Crohn's disease, type 1 diabetes, and rheumatoid arthritis.
