= NHL repeat =

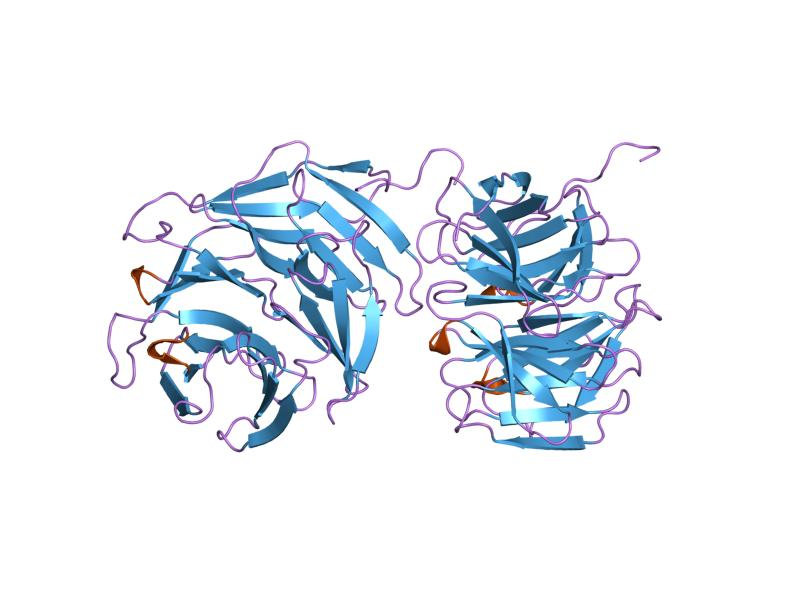
- Structure of the brain tumor-Pumilio translation repressor complex.

Identifiers
- Symbol: NHL
- Pfam: PF01436
- Pfam clan: CL0186
- InterPro: IPR001258
- SCOP2: 1q7f / SCOPe / SUPFAM
- CDD: cd05819
Available protein structures:
- Pfam: structures / ECOD
- PDB: RCSB PDB; PDBe; PDBj
- PDBsum: structure summary
- PDB: 1q7f , 1rwi , 1rwl

The NHL repeat, named after ncl-1, HT2A and lin-41, is an amino acid sequence found largely in a large number of eukaryotic and prokaryotic proteins. For example, the repeat is found in a variety of enzymes of the copper type II, ascorbate-dependent monooxygenase family which catalyse the C-terminus alpha-amidation of biological peptides. In many it occurs in tandem arrays, for example in the RING finger beta-box, coiled-coil (RBCC) eukaryotic growth regulators. The arthropod 'Brain Tumor' protein (Brat; Q8MQJ9) is one such growth regulator that contains a 6-bladed NHL-repeat beta-propeller.

The NHL repeats are also found in serine/threonine protein kinase (STPK) in diverse range of pathogenic bacteria. These STPK are transmembrane receptors with an intracellular N-terminal kinase domain and extracellular C-terminal sensor domain. In the STPK, PknD, from Mycobacterium tuberculosis, the sensor domain forms a rigid, six-bladed b-propeller composed of NHL repeats with a flexible tether to the transmembrane domain.

The NHL repeat has also been used to design a family of fully symmetrical 6-blade beta-propeller proteins called "Pizza". These proteins can also be engineered to bind mineral nanocrystals.
