= Gasdermin A =

Protein-coding gene in the species Homo sapiens

GSDMA

Identifiers
- Aliases: GSDMA, GSDM, GSDM1, FKSG9, gasdermin A
- External IDs: OMIM: 611218; MGI: 1889509; GeneCards: GSDMA

Gene location (Human)
Chr.	Chromosome 17 (human)
Band	17q21.1	Start	39,953,263 bp
Band	17q21.1	End	39,977,768 bp

Gene location (Mouse)
Chr.	Chromosome 11 (mouse)
Band	11|11 D	Start	98,555,177 bp
Band	11|11 D	End	98,568,534 bp
RNA expression pattern
Bgee	Human / Mouse (ortholog); Top expressed in: skin of leg; skin of abdomen; granulocyte; placenta; gastric mucosa; gonad; smooth muscle tissue; appendix; gallbladder; duodenum / Top expressed in: esophagus; lip; skin of back; seminal vesicula; skin of external ear; hair follicle; skin of abdomen; epithelium of gastric gland; umbilical cord; seminiferous tubule; More reference expression data
BioGPS	n/a
Gene ontology
Molecular function	phosphatidylserine binding; phosphatidylinositol-4,5-bisphosphate binding; phosphatidylinositol-4-phosphate binding
Cellular component	cytoplasm; perinuclear region of cytoplasm; cytosol; plasma membrane; membrane
Biological process	programmed cell death; apoptotic process; pyroptosis
Sources:Amigo / QuickGO
Orthologs
Databases	NCBI: entry; OMA: entry
Species	Human	Mouse
Entrez	284110	57911
Ensembl	ENSG00000167914	ENSMUSG00000017204
UniProt	Q96QA5	Q9EST1
RefSeq (mRNA)	NM_178171	NM_021347
RefSeq (protein)	NP_835465	NP_067322
Location (UCSC)	Chr 17: 39.95 – 39.98 Mb	Chr 11: 98.56 – 98.57 Mb
PubMed search
- Wikidata
View/Edit Human	View/Edit Mouse

Gasdermin A is a protein that in humans is encoded by the GSDMA gene.
