= GSDMC =

Protein-coding gene in the species Homo sapiens

Identifiers
- Aliases: GSDMC, MLZE, gasdermin C
- External IDs: OMIM: 608384; MGI: 2146102; GeneCards: GSDMC

Gene location (Mouse)
Chr.	Chromosome 15 (mouse)
Band	15|15 D1	Start	63,696,195 bp
Band	15|15 D1	End	63,717,026 bp
RNA expression pattern
Bgee	Human / Mouse (ortholog); Top expressed in: zone of skin; skin of abdomen; spleen; vagina; skeletal muscle tissue; minor salivary glands; gastrocnemius muscle; left ventricle; thymus; urinary bladder / Top expressed in: medullary collecting duct; transitional epithelium of urinary bladder; left colon; zygote; intestinal gland; secondary oocyte; crypt of lieberkuhn of small intestine; jejunum; primary oocyte; stomach; More reference expression data
BioGPS	n/a
Gene ontology
Molecular function	molecular function; phosphatidylserine binding; phosphatidylinositol-4,5-bisphosphate binding; phosphatidylinositol-4-phosphate binding
Cellular component	cytoplasm; mitochondrion; microtubule organizing center; cytosol; plasma membrane; membrane
Biological process	programmed cell death; biological process; pyroptosis
Sources:Amigo / QuickGO
Orthologs
Databases	NCBI: entry
Species	Human	Mouse
Entrez	56169	331063
Ensembl	n/a	ENSMUSG00000056293
UniProt	Q9BYG8	Q2KHK6
RefSeq (mRNA)	NM_031415	NM_001168274; NM_177912
RefSeq (protein)	NP_113603	NP_001161746; NP_808580
Location (UCSC)	n/a	Chr 15: 63.7 – 63.72 Mb
PubMed search
- Wikidata
View/Edit Human	View/Edit Mouse

Gasdermin C is a protein that in humans is encoded by the GSDMC gene.
