= ORMDL1 =

Protein-coding gene in the species Homo sapiens

Identifiers
- Aliases: ORMDL1, ORMDL sphingolipid biosynthesis regulator 1
- External IDs: OMIM: 610073; MGI: 2181669; HomoloGene: 41135; GeneCards: ORMDL1; OMA:ORMDL1 - orthologs

Gene location (Human)
Chr.	Chromosome 2 (human)
Band	2q32.2	Start	189,770,267 bp
Band	2q32.2	End	189,784,364 bp

Gene location (Mouse)
Chr.	Chromosome 1 (mouse)
Band	1|1 C1.1	Start	53,336,254 bp
Band	1|1 C1.1	End	53,349,468 bp
RNA expression pattern
Bgee	Human / Mouse (ortholog); Top expressed in: body of pancreas; granulocyte; spleen; monocyte; anterior pituitary; gastric mucosa; right lung; mucosa of ileum; gallbladder; right uterine tube / Top expressed in: transitional epithelium of urinary bladder; medial ganglionic eminence; endocardial cushion; abdominal wall; left lobe of liver; Paneth cell; migratory enteric neural crest cell; primitive streak; atrioventricular junction; atrioventricular valve; More reference expression data
BioGPS	n/a
Orthologs
Species	Human	Mouse
Entrez	94101	227102
Ensembl	ENSG00000128699	ENSMUSG00000026097
UniProt	Q9P0S3	Q921I0
RefSeq (mRNA)	NM_001128150; NM_016467	NM_145517
RefSeq (protein)	NP_001121622; NP_057551; NP_001358313; NP_001358314; NP_001358315 NP_001358316; NP_001358317	NP_663492
Location (UCSC)	Chr 2: 189.77 – 189.78 Mb	Chr 1: 53.34 – 53.35 Mb
PubMed search
- Wikidata
View/Edit Human	View/Edit Mouse

ORMDL sphingolipid biosynthesis regulator 1 is a protein that in humans is encoded by the ORMDL1 gene.
