= Caspase 5 =

Enzyme found in humans

CASP5

Identifiers
- Aliases: CASP5, ICE(rel)III, ICEREL-III, ICH-3, caspase 5
- External IDs: OMIM: 602665; MGI: 107700; GeneCards: CASP5
Enzyme activity
| EC # | BRENDA | ExPASy | KEGG | MetaCyc |
|---|---|---|---|---|
| 3.4.22.58 | ↗ | ↗ | ↗ | ↗ |

Gene location (Human)
| Chr. | Chromosome 11 (human) |
| Band | 11q22.3 | Start | 104,994,235 bp |
| Band | 11q22.3 | End | 105,023,168 bp |

Gene location (Mouse)
| Chr. | Chromosome 9 (mouse) |
| Band | 9 A1|9 2.46 cM | Start | 5,308,828 bp |
| Band | 9 A1|9 2.46 cM | End | 5,336,783 bp |
RNA expression pattern
| Bgee | Human / Mouse (ortholog); Top expressed in: rectum; testicle; monocyte; blood; appendix; mucosa of transverse colon; granulocyte; mucosa of sigmoid colon; duodenum; spleen / Top expressed in: granulocyte; jejunum; ileum; duodenum; large intestine; Paneth cell; colon; endothelial cell of lymphatic vessel; uterus; intestinal villus; More reference expression data |
| BioGPS | n/a |
Gene ontology
| Molecular function | peptidase activity; cysteine-type peptidase activity; hydrolase activity; scaffold protein binding; cysteine-type endopeptidase activity involved in execution phase of apoptosis; cysteine-type endopeptidase activity involved in apoptotic process; cysteine-type endopeptidase activity; cysteine-type endopeptidase activity involved in apoptotic signaling pathway; protein binding |
| Cellular component | NLRP3 inflammasome complex; AIM2 inflammasome complex; IPAF inflammasome complex; NLRP1 inflammasome complex; soma; neuron projection; cytoplasm |
| Biological process | regulation of apoptotic process; ectopic germ cell programmed cell death; cellular response to mechanical stimulus; substantia nigra development; pyroptosis; proteolysis; regulation of inflammatory response; apoptotic process; execution phase of apoptosis; activation of cysteine-type endopeptidase activity involved in apoptotic process; apoptotic signaling pathway |
Sources:Amigo / QuickGO
Orthologs
| Databases | NCBI: entry; OMA: entry |
| Species | Human | Mouse |
| Entrez | 838 | 12363 |
| Ensembl | ENSG00000137757 | ENSMUSG00000033538 |
| UniProt | P51878 | P70343 |
| RefSeq (mRNA) | NM_001136109; NM_001136110; NM_001136112; NM_004347 | NM_007609 |
| RefSeq (protein) | NP_001129581; NP_001129582; NP_001129584; NP_004338 | NP_031635; NP_001366247; NP_001366248; NP_001366249; NP_001366250 NP_001366251; NP_001366252 |
| Location (UCSC) | Chr 11: 104.99 – 105.02 Mb | Chr 9: 5.31 – 5.34 Mb |
| PubMed search |
- Wikidata
| View/Edit Human | View/Edit Mouse |

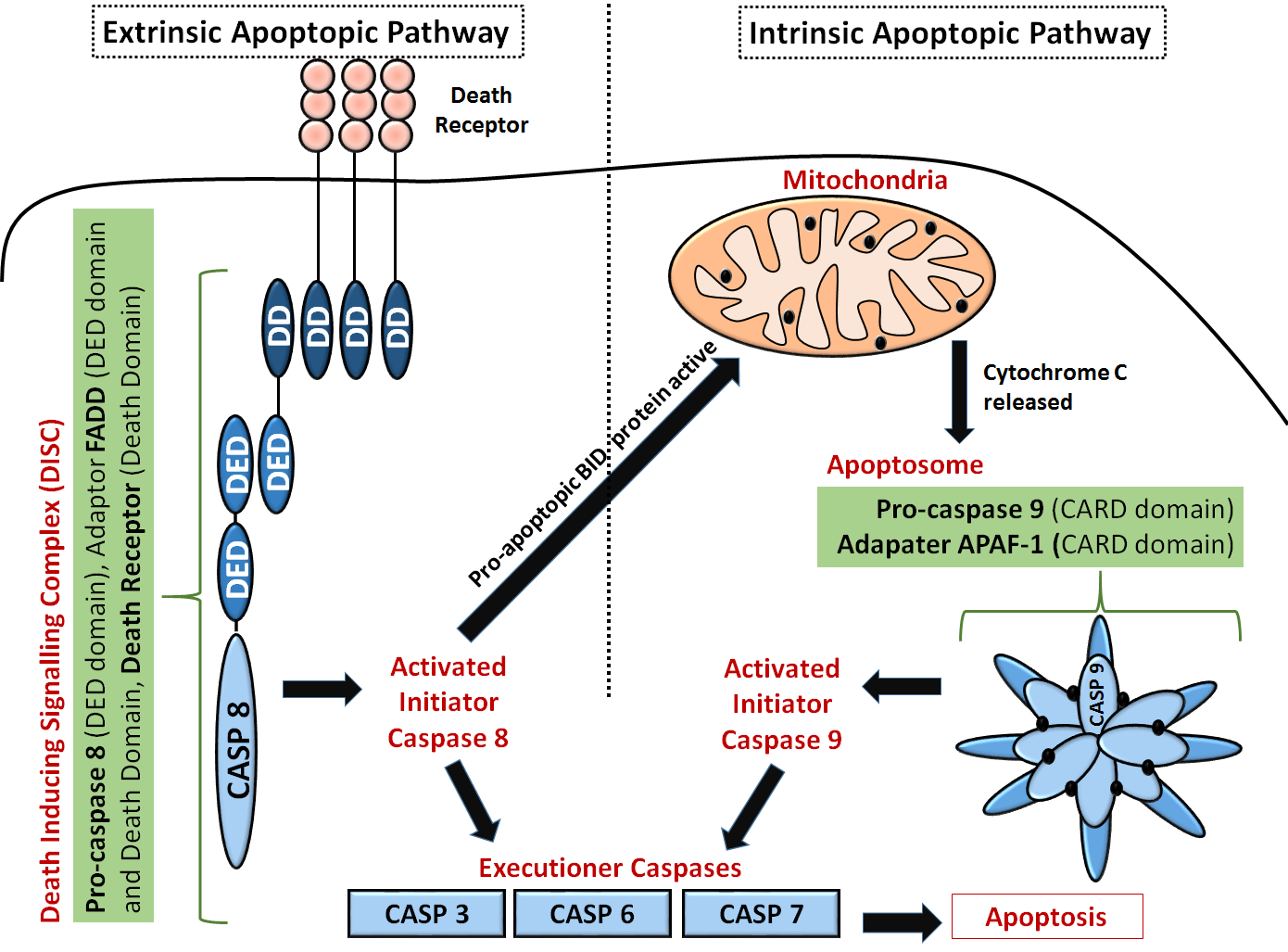
Intrinsic and Extrinsic pathways of caspase activation

Caspase 5 is an enzyme that in humans is encoded by the CASP5 gene. This enzyme proteolytically cleaves other proteins at an aspartic acid residue, and belongs to a family of cysteine proteases called caspases. It is an inflammatory caspase, along with caspase 1, caspase 4 and the murine caspase 4 homolog caspase 11, and has a role in the immune system.

== See also ==
- The Proteolysis Map
- Caspase
