= Caspase 11 =

Class of enzymes

Caspase-11

Identifiers
- EC no.: 3.4.22.64

Databases
- IntEnz: IntEnz view
- BRENDA: BRENDA entry
- ExPASy: NiceZyme view
- KEGG: KEGG entry
- MetaCyc: metabolic pathway
- PRIAM: profile
- PDB structures: RCSB PDB PDBe PDBsum
Search
- PMC: articles
- PubMed: articles
- NCBI: proteins

Murine caspase-11, and its human homologs caspase-4 and caspase-5, are mammalian intracellular receptor proteases activated by TLR4 and TLR3 signaling during the innate immune response. Caspase-11, also termed the non-canonical inflammasome, is activated by TLR3/TLR4-TRIF signaling and directly binds cytosolic lipopolysaccharide (LPS), a major structural element of Gram-negative bacterial cell walls. Activation of caspase-11 by LPS is known to cause the activation of other caspase proteins, leading to septic shock, pyroptosis, and often organismal death.

== History ==
LPS is a known activator of innate immune responses. Extracellular LPS binds specifically to the cell surface receptor TLR4. LPS binding to TLR4 subsequently causes initiation of the MyD88 and TRIF signaling pathways, leading to expression of pro-inflammatory molecules and cytokines. These inflammatory mediators cause host toxic shock and sepsis as a result of an overactive immune response to LPS. Until recently, TLR4 was considered the sole receptor for LPS.

However, in 2013 it was shown that TLR4 knockout mice treated with the TLR3 ligand poly I:C still die of toxic shock induced by LPS treatment. Conversely, it was also found that poly I:C treated TLR4 and caspase-11 double knockout mice do not develop toxic shock in response to LPS. These results suggest that TLR4 is not the sole LPS receptor but that caspase-11 also responds to the presence of LPS. Caspase-11 was subsequently shown to be a cytosolic protein that responds solely to intracellular, cytosolic LPS.

Though caspase-11 was thought to be activated only by TLR4, these experiments showed that it was in fact activated by TRIF signaling, mediated by both TLR4 and TLR3 stimulation. Caspase-11 can therefore mediate host LPS sensing even in the absence of TLR4, provided an alternative TRIF-dependent signal (e.g., by TLR3) is provided.

== Mechanism ==
TRIF activation is necessary for the upregulation of pro-caspase-11 (an inactive precursor to active caspase-11) expression and caspase-11-mediated pyroptosis. Once expressed, caspase-11 is only able to bind cytosolic LPS and cannot respond to extracellular LPS. Caspase-11 will only recognize the hexa- and penta-acylated forms of LPS. LPS enters the cytosol through intracellular infection of vacuolar Gram-negative bacteria. These bacteria activate IFN-induced guanylate binding proteins, which are thought to mediate caspase-11 activation by promoting vacuolar lysis and release of bacteria and the LPS they produce into the cytoplasm.

Surprisingly, it has recently been shown that LPS activates caspase-11 not through a receptor/scaffold mediator, but through direct LPS binding to the caspase-11 CARD domain. This mechanism contrasts to that of the canonical inflammasome, in which a bacterial ligand activates caspase-1 through an upstream sensor protein, and this is the reason why caspase-11 is often referred to as the non-canonical inflammasome. Caspase-11 activation by direct binding to LPS represents a novel and unprecedented mechanism for caspase activation.

Caspase-11 activation results in pyroptosis, a form of lytic cell death that releases inflammatory molecules such as ATP, HMGB1 and IL-1α from the cytosol. Inflammatory cytokines such as IL-1β and IL-18 are also often produced. Production of IL-1β downstream of caspase-11 requires another canonical inflammasome, called the NLRP3 inflammasome, that activates caspase-1. The mechanism linking caspase-11 to NLRP3 is not currently known.

Pyroptosis has been proposed to provide immune defense by exposing cytosolic bacteria infecting the pyroptotic cell to extracellular immune defenses, including other immune cells such as neutrophils. While caspase-11-mediated pyroptosis provides defense against pathogens, it has also been shown to cause damage to the host as well.

The CARD domain of caspase-11 has been shown to associate with AIP-1 and cofilin to facilitate actin depolymerization. In addition, association with the actin cytoskeleton surrounding the phagosome contributes to lysosome acidification.

== Chemical reaction ==
Caspase-11 (EC 3.4.22.64, CASP-11) is an protease enzyme that has a preferred cleavage sequence of (Ile/Leu/Val/Phe)-Gly-His-Asp, with a strict requirement for Asp at the P1 position.

== Medical relevance ==
Caspase-11 appears to provide immune defense against bacteria that enter or access the host cell cytosol. Caspase-11 has been shown to be activated by Burkholderia pseudomallei, Gram-negative bacteria found in the soil of southeast Asia that cause severe melioidosis. Caspase-11 has been shown in vitro to be activated by Shigella flexneri infection, while a guinea pig model of Shigella infection has been shown to activate the human homolog of caspase-11, caspase-4. For bacteria that do not typically access the host cytosol, caspase-11 is activated with delayed kinetics if Gram-negative bacteria aberrantly escape the vacuole and enter into the cytoplasm.

Caspase-11 has been shown to contribute to lethality in mouse models of sepsis. Toxic shock and sepsis may occur if too many host cells undergo pyroptosis, owing to either overstimulation of the immune system by the released cytoplasmic contents or to host cell depletion. The mechanism by which pyroptosis contributes to septic shock and death is not well understood, although HMGB1 release is thought to play a role.
