= GSDMB =

Protein-coding gene in the species Homo sapiens

Identifiers
- Aliases: GSDMB, GSDML, PRO2521, PP4052, gasdermin B, GSDMB-1
- External IDs: OMIM: 611221; GeneCards: GSDMB

Gene location (Human)
Chr.	Chromosome 17 (human)
Band	17q21.1	Start	39,904,595 bp
Band	17q21.1	End	39,919,854 bp
RNA expression pattern
Bgee	Human / Mouse (ortholog); Top expressed in: rectum; right lobe of liver; mucosa of transverse colon; granulocyte; mucosa of ileum; duodenum; cerebellar hemisphere; right hemisphere of cerebellum; jejunal mucosa; body of stomach / n/a; More reference expression data
BioGPS	n/a
Gene ontology
Molecular function	molecular function; phosphatidylserine binding; phosphatidylinositol-4,5-bisphosphate binding; phosphatidylinositol-4-phosphate binding
Cellular component	cytoplasm; cytosol; plasma membrane; membrane; cellular component
Biological process	programmed cell death; biological process; pyroptosis
Sources:Amigo / QuickGO
Orthologs
Databases	NCBI: entry; OMA: entry
Species	Human	Mouse
Entrez	55876	n/a
Ensembl	ENSG00000073605	n/a
UniProt	Q8TAX9	n/a
RefSeq (mRNA)	NM_001042471; NM_001165958; NM_001165959; NM_018530; NM_001369402	n/a
RefSeq (protein)	NP_001035936; NP_001159430; NP_001159431; NP_061000; NP_001356331	n/a
Location (UCSC)	Chr 17: 39.9 – 39.92 Mb	n/a
PubMed search		n/a
- Wikidata
View/Edit Human

Gasdermin B is a protein that in humans is encoded by the GSDMB gene.

== Function ==
This gene encodes a member of the gasdermin-domain containing protein family. Other gasdermin-family genes are implicated in the regulation of apoptosis in epithelial cells, and are linked to cancer. Multiple transcript variants encoding different isoforms have been found for this gene. Additional variants have been described, but they are candidates for nonsense-mediated mRNA decay (NMD) and are unlikely to be protein-coding.

== Clinical significance ==
GSDMB expression has been linked to higher survival rates for lung cancer patients.
