= Caspase 4 =

Enzyme found in humans

CASP4

Identifiers
- Aliases: CASP4, ICE(rel)II, ICEREL-II, ICH-2, Mih1/TX, TX, Mih1, caspase 4
- External IDs: OMIM: 602664; MGI: 107700; GeneCards: CASP4
Enzyme activity
EC #	BRENDA	ExPASy	KEGG	MetaCyc
3.4.22.57	↗	↗	↗	↗

Gene location (Human)
Chr.	Chromosome 11 (human)
Band	11q22.3	Start	104,942,866 bp
Band	11q22.3	End	104,969,366 bp

Gene location (Mouse)
Chr.	Chromosome 9 (mouse)
Band	9 A1|9 2.46 cM	Start	5,308,828 bp
Band	9 A1|9 2.46 cM	End	5,336,783 bp
RNA expression pattern
Bgee	Human / Mouse (ortholog); Top expressed in: monocyte; granulocyte; blood; Achilles tendon; upper lobe of left lung; body of pancreas; gallbladder; right lung; spleen; epithelium of colon / Top expressed in: granulocyte; jejunum; ileum; duodenum; large intestine; Paneth cell; colon; endothelial cell of lymphatic vessel; uterus; intestinal villus; More reference expression data
BioGPS	n/a
Gene ontology
Molecular function	cysteine-type peptidase activity; peptidase activity; hydrolase activity; cysteine-type endopeptidase activity involved in execution phase of apoptosis; cysteine-type endopeptidase activity involved in apoptotic process; cysteine-type endopeptidase activity; CARD domain binding; cysteine-type endopeptidase activity involved in apoptotic signaling pathway; protein binding
Cellular component	NLRP3 inflammasome complex; cytoplasm; endoplasmic reticulum membrane; membrane; extracellular region; AIM2 inflammasome complex; IPAF inflammasome complex; endoplasmic reticulum; mitochondrion; inflammasome complex; cytosol; plasma membrane; protein-containing complex
Biological process	regulation of apoptotic process; programmed cell death; immune system process; proteolysis; intrinsic apoptotic signaling pathway; intrinsic apoptotic signaling pathway in response to endoplasmic reticulum stress; regulation of inflammatory response; innate immune response; inflammatory response; cellular response to amyloid-beta; apoptotic process; execution phase of apoptosis; positive regulation of tumor necrosis factor-mediated signaling pathway; activation of cysteine-type endopeptidase activity involved in apoptotic process
Sources:Amigo / QuickGO
Orthologs
Databases	NCBI: entry; OMA: entry
Species	Human	Mouse
Entrez	837	12363
Ensembl	ENSG00000196954	ENSMUSG00000033538
UniProt	P49662	P70343
RefSeq (mRNA)	NM_001225; NM_033306; NM_033307	NM_007609
RefSeq (protein)	NP_001216; NP_150649	NP_031635; NP_001366247; NP_001366248; NP_001366249; NP_001366250 NP_001366251; NP_001366252
Location (UCSC)	Chr 11: 104.94 – 104.97 Mb	Chr 9: 5.31 – 5.34 Mb
PubMed search
- Wikidata
View/Edit Human	View/Edit Mouse

Caspase 4 is an enzyme that in human is encoded by the CASP4 gene.

Caspase 4 proteolytically cleaves other proteins at an aspartic acid residue (LEVD-), and belongs to a family of cysteine proteases called caspases. The function of caspase 4 is not fully known, but it is believed to be an inflammatory caspase, along with caspase 1, caspase 5 (and the murine homolog caspase 11), with a role in the immune system.

The anti-inflammatory drug indoprofen is an inhibitor of the activity of the caspase-4 enzyme.

== See also ==
- The Proteolysis Map
- Caspase
