= Diet-induced obesity model =

Animal model used in laboratory research

The diet-induced obesity model (DIO model) is an animal model used to study obesity using animals that have obesity caused by being fed high-fat or high-density diets. It is intended to mimic the most common cause of obesity in humans. Typically mice, rats, dogs, or non-human primates are used in these models. These animals can then be used to study in vivo obesity, obesity's comorbidities, and other related diseases. Users of such models must take into account the duration and type of diet (e.g. hydrated gels vs. dry pellets) as well as the environmental conditions and age of the animals, as each may promote different bodyweights, fat percentages, or behaviors.

Driven by the worldwide epidemic of obesity, particularly in the Western world, the DIO model has been integral in understanding the relationship between high-fat/high-density diets and obesity, including the discovery of Akt and mTOR, signals in the body linked to obesity and insulin resistance. However, while many insights into the control of obesity have come from experiments since its introduction in 1949, the use of animal models does restrict our ability to extrapolate findings to humans.

== History ==
The DIO model was developed in response to growing concerns over the health effects of obesity, as well as the rapid growth of the obesity rate in countries around the world. As such, the model was developed in order to create a controlled environment for the study of how obesity develops, as well as its effects. The model was used as early as 1949, and has expanded far and wide in its use and goals.

Date	Event
September 1978	First study tested to find correlation between obesity and palatable foods high in fats and lipids, but no conclusion could be reached.
1982	Study testing the effects of obesity on the sympathetic nervous system of rats, namely blood pressure. It was found that obesity had a stimulating effect, increasing blood pressure and increasing the risk of hypertension.
1995	A study conducted in order to study the expression of the ob gene in rat adipose tissue through the control of their diets. The study also checked for the effects of diabetes on the gene expression.
June 2002	Göttingen minipig "pilot" study: published paper on a three month long experiment testing a nonrodent model to see if results could be accepted in DIO research or be compared to results of those studies where rodents were tested.
2007	Continued exploration of diet-induced obesity led to a study of rats as a potential model subject. This genomic based study induced obesity in rats and subsequently analyzed RNA microarrays to characterize the rats metabolic response and resultant insulin sensitivity.
2009	The model is used to challenge beliefs about the causes of obesity in the population, as a group of scientists decided to test the notion that obesity is a result of overnutrition and could be controlled by limiting meal sizes.
2010	Continuing the trend of the model's usage in determining causes of obesity, a group of researchers notice the changes across the diets of several Americans and conduct an experiment to understand why obesity was up when fat consumption was down. For this, they investigate the connection between the types of fat, meal timings and size, and weight gain as well as the reversibility of diet-induced obesity.
July 2011	Different Diet Stimuli: Diets varying from hyperlipic, hypercaloric, cholesterol-rich, and cafeteria diets were tested on rodents to see which had the most impact on body size and to determine differences between metabolic responses in rodents and humans.
2012	A 2012 study further explored the viability of the diet-induced obesity model by testing several mice for their reactivities to a high-caloric diet. The resulting data found some mice (the B6 mouse) responded to diet-induced obesity most similarly to humans with regards to several parameters including fat content, relative organ size, and general body composition.

== Other causes of obesity ==
=== Social determinants ===
Social and environmental determinants may also induce the onset of obesity. Social class may affect individual access to proper nutritional education and may hinder an individual's ability to make healthy lifestyle choices. Additionally, samples of low-income women and children were also shown to have higher rates of obesity because of stress. Exposure to pollutants such as smoke and second-hand smoke have also shown direct correlations to obesity.

=== Gut bacteria ===
Studies on the relationship between infectious agents and weight gain show that certain species of gut flora can affect metabolic processes. This correlation links these gut bacteria to an inability to digest complex polysaccharides. Certain viruses, specifically the AD-36 adenovirus, have been shown to increase body fat in laboratory animals.

=== Sedentary lifestyle ===
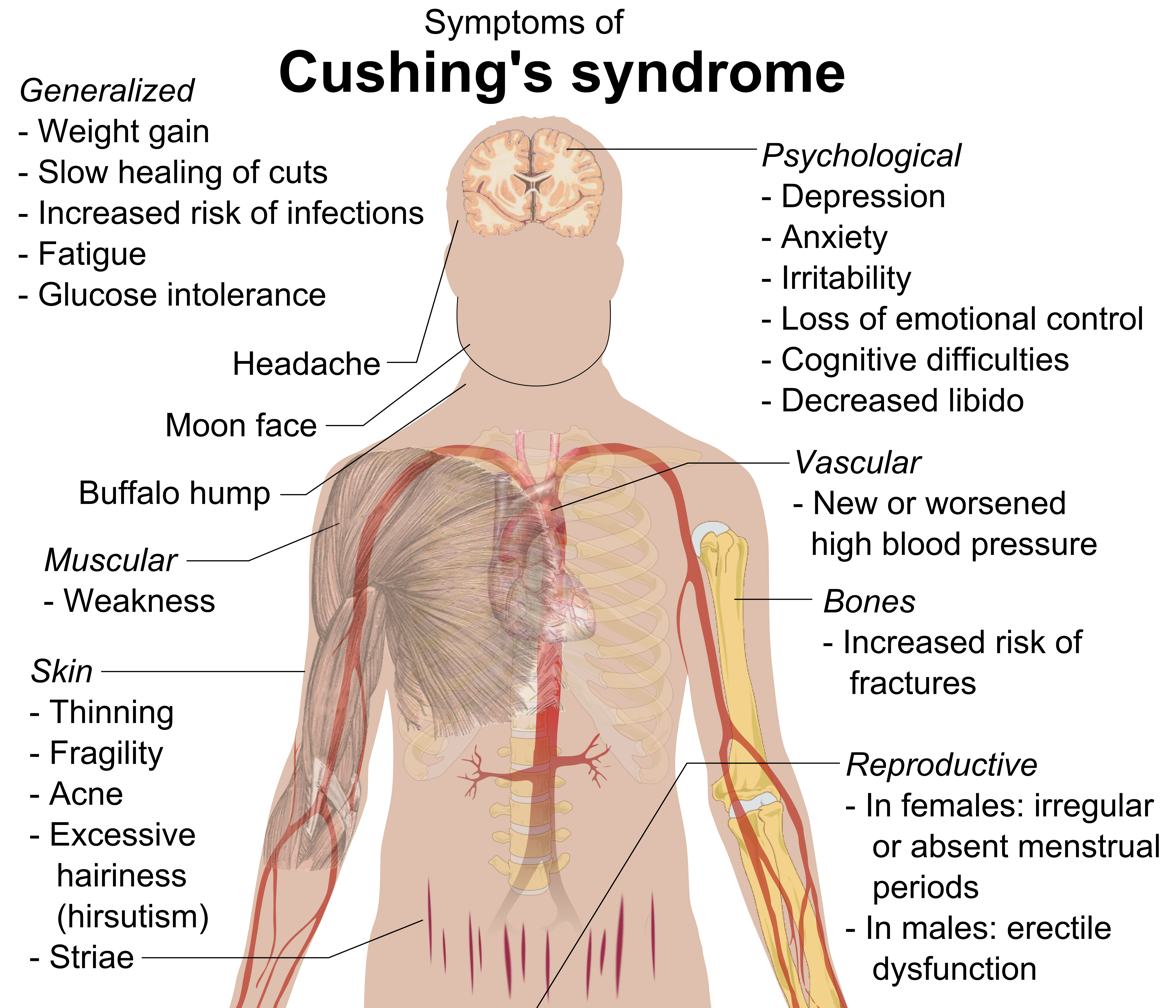
Symptoms of Cushing's syndrome

Living a sedentary lifestyle is one of the leading factors in causing obesity. As of 2016, over 30% of people in the world do not get enough exercise.

=== Genetic-based obesity ===
Genetic mutations to genes monitoring metabolism and appetite predispose people to obesity. Various syndromes resulting in genetic polymorphisms lead to obesity. A few common examples are: Prader-Willi syndrome, Bardet-Biedl syndrome, Cohen syndrome, and MOMO syndrome.

=== Other illnesses ===
Multiple mental and physical illnesses, along with some of the medications that treat such illnesses can increase someone's risk of obesity. Some examples of other illnesses are hypothyroidism, Cushing's syndrome, and growth hormone deficiency.

== Limitations ==
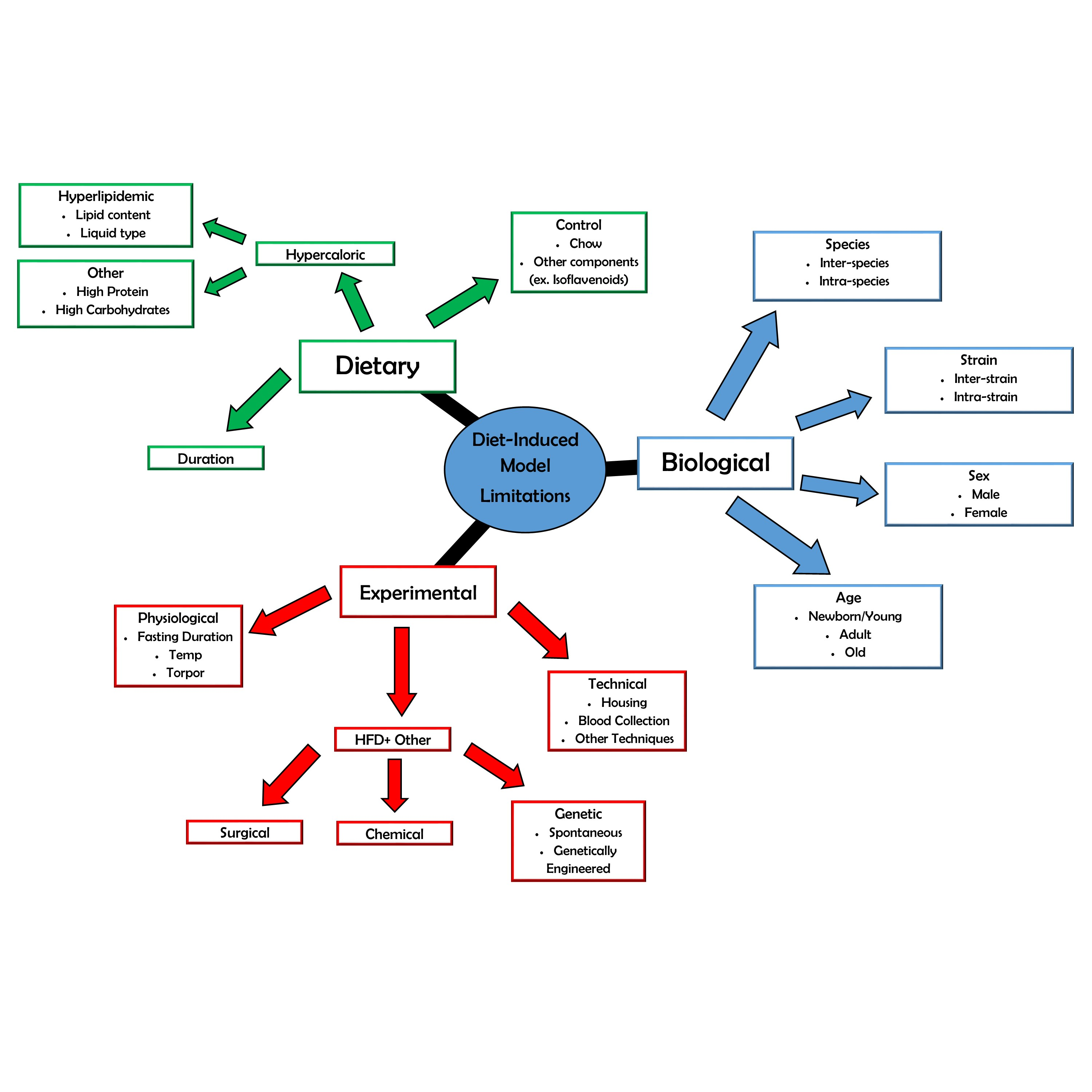
Different limitations of the diet-induced obesity model. Adapted from M Lai, P C Chandrasekera and N D Barnard figure 1.

Obesity is affected by "environmental, biological, and psychosocial pressures", therefore it is understandable that several limitations are established when translating results between the results of a diet induced obesity model in a lab and humans. While models are an important method of investigating the influences of obesity and drug testing, it is important to understand the limits of the model's overall ability to resemble the human obesogenic pathophysiology. Such limitations can be divided into three broad categories—biological, dietary and experimental differences—factors including, but not limited to, the genetic makeup of the species or strain, the environment in which the specimen is held (temperature, light, number of animals), age, sex, the duration of the experiment, and the texture or type of rations fed to the animals.

=== Biological ===
Numerous sources of biological variation arise in rodents before translating results to humans is even considered. For instance, the age at which mice begin the high-fat diet greatly impacts the metabolic effects. In the strain of mice most commonly used for DIO models, C57BL/6J, mice who started the diet at 10 weeks old showed lower increases in body weight and cholesterol than mice who started at 54 weeks, despite the same diet type and duration. Similarly, 6-week-old mice did not develop type diabetes, while 7-8-month old mice did become diabetic due to differences in β-cell activity.

Furthermore, the strain and sex of the rodent impacts the response to the model. Some common mouse strains show large variations in their level of resistance to obesity. Further variation is seen when the sex is also factored in; males of the S5B/P1 strain showed 12% weight gain, while females gained no weight at all. Even within a single strain, large amounts of variation in the phenotype can be seen, despite each mouse having identical genetic backgrounds, which greatly hinders reproducibility.

This has led to cases of studies that used the same strain of mice concluding that the strain is prone to becoming obese in one study and resistant in the other study. So, despite the fact that variability is clearly present in humans, variability in mice is once again detrimental to the reproducibility of results obtained from the diet induced obesity model.

When functional genomics is applied, few commonalities between the gene expression of DIO vs control rodents and obese vs non-obese humans are found. This is particularly true in the case of glucose regulation, which greatly hinders the ability to apply the results of the DIO model to humans, especially for drug development.

=== Dietary ===
There high fat diet experiments that have been done in rodents realizing the difficulties in interpreting the literature composition of high fat diet into actual experiment.

With varied sources and types of fat, researches have shown the complexity of defining a model of a high fat diet that can both resemble human meals and accurately quantify the nutrient contents. In fact, recent studies prefer to use purified ingredients to exams the effect of each dietary on rodents' metabolism and their phenotype.

There is significant variation in the results appearing in either experimental rodents that were fed with high fat diets made up from different ingredients and from purified ingredient. Moreover, the sources of fat were diverse from butter, beef tallow, and lard, to vegetable and fish oils. The weight gaining effects on mice when feeding those with high beef fat diet is 1.38 times more remarkable than feeding them with canola oil.

Additionally, they both can be found in rodents' and humans' diets. Researchers have created the study models of high carbohydrate and high proteins. However, the variation in the results of those models has caused the difficulties to interpret and find the relation to human case. According to a review on Nutrition & Diet, there were number of studies ignoring the nutrient composition differences between the control and the high fat diets, but comparing the phenotype expression of these two groups to conclude the influence of hypercaloric diets in causing obesity.

Similar to fat (lipid), the sources of protein and carbohydrate are also essential contributors to the outcomes of high fat diets and control diets rodents group. For instance, casein causes more weight gaining compared to soy. Moreover, different mouse strains can express contradicting results, even though they are both fed with same protein and carbohydrate ratios. In addition to protein, Fructose, a carbohydrate, has impact on fat deposition, plasma insulin, leptin, thyroid, estradiol, and corticosterone levels, lipogenesis, and lipolysis in the adipose tissue of the rat. "Glucose-sweetened beverages," however, did not cause as significant influence as "fructose-sweetened beverages" in promoting visceral adipose, gaining weight, interrupting lipid syntheses, and damaging lipoprotein rebuilding process.

Given the diversity in human food and each human individually distinguished metabolic capacity, the results of testing the diet induce obesity in rodents are limited in term of translatability. Furthermore, dietary components would provide a spectrum of results since both type of diets one with mixture of ingredients-"cafeteria diet" and one with predefined ingredients would alter different impact on the metabolism of the body.

=== Experimental ===
Intra and Inter Laboratories results can differ due to variation in the experimental factors such as the protocol used, housing, temperature, light/dark cycle and the duration of study.

Laboratories temperature which are usually (18-22 °C) are lower than the thermoneutrality of model organisms like mice which are about 30 °C. That can introduce hyperphagia in the organism in effort of increasing their metabolism to generate heat energy for the body. This level of thermal stress can also have unaccounted effects on the organism's other metabolic processes.

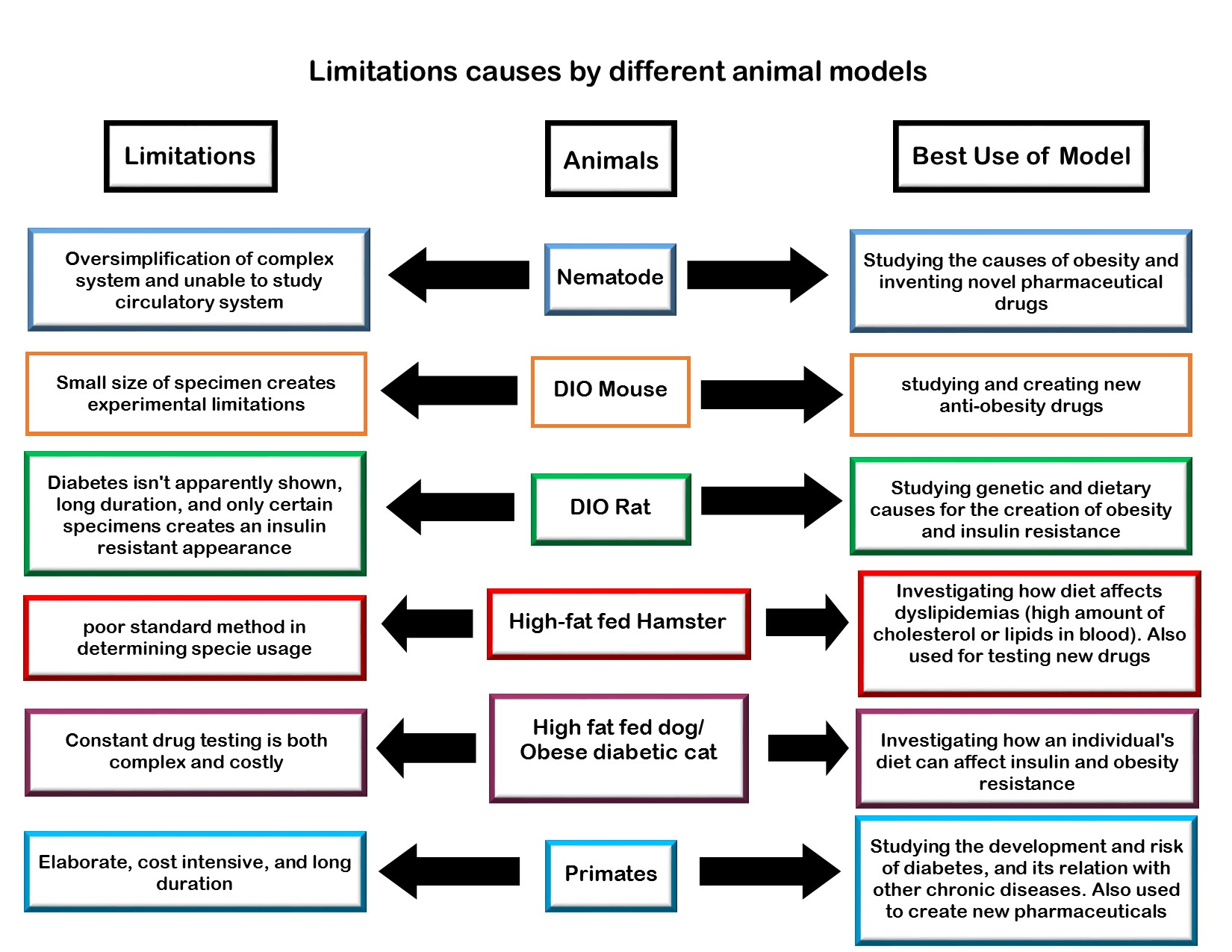
The limitations that exist when performing a diet induced obesity model on different animals. Adapted from Tanja Y. Reuter Table 1. Nematode Information. Primate Information.

Furthermore, the spatial confinements in housing organisms can affect the brain chemistry in social creatures like mice and rats, making them more vulnerable to slower brain development and abnormalities due to the lack of social interactions. The psychological effects can introduce further discrepancy in the studies that makes it difficult to render proper data and further hinders the possibility of recapitulating such experiments in humans.

Rodents are nocturnal and are mostly feeding at night, in their natural habitat. The changes in the light/dark cycle of laboratories can alter their circadian rhythm which can affect their metabolism. Besides that several studies used genetically modified mouse models that have decreased circadian rhythmicity gene. These cases have resulted in the increase of metabolic syndrome in the mouse models as well as resulted in obesity. The change in the phenotype can be a result of genetic modification of circadian clock gene, high fat diet, disruption of the circadian cycle by changes in light and dark cycle, or a combination of all the factors. Further research is required to find the exact cause.

The cause of type 2 diabetes mellitus in humans are far more complicated than the sole consumption of a high fat diet. The mental, emotional and cultural factors along with insulin resistance and hyperphagia are known to increase the occurrence of type 2 diabetes in humans. However, type 2 diabetes in model organisms are introduced via surgery of partial or whole pancreas, or using chemicals such as streptozotocin. Streptozotocin inhibits the ability of pancreatic β cells to produce insulin, and depending on the dosage used, the result can be partial or absolute inhibition. It can also interfere with other cell signalling pathways as well as affects the content of certain isozymes in organs like liver, brain and kidneys. The lack of proper representation of the undertaking of the experiment can introduce type 2 diabetes, but fails to reflect the mechanism through which these disease takes place in humans.

== Model species ==
=== Mice ===
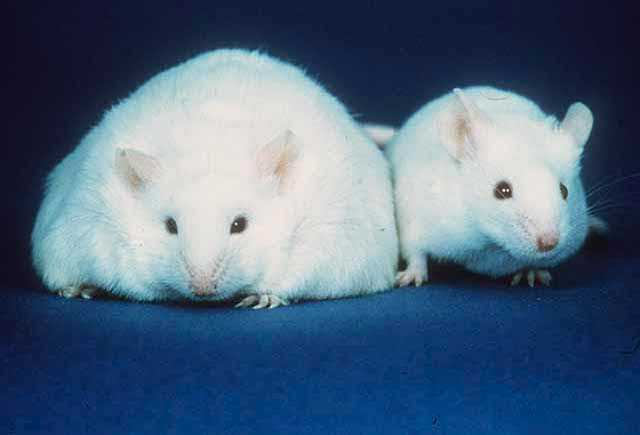
An obese mouse and a normal weight mouse

Mice are used by scientists as diet-induced obesity models in experiments because they have mammalian physiological systems similar to those in humans. They also can be bred or genetically engineered to be resistant to certain diseases, which can be important for studies of these diseases and/or their influence on other biological systems.

Scientists used mice to study the effect of lymphotoxins on metabolism. Mice without lymphotoxin alpha, lymphotoxin beta, or a lymphotoxin beta receptor had poorly composed microbiota, which made them resistant to obesity. Mice without lymphotoxin alpha, lymphotoxin beta, or a lymphotoxin beta receptor gained less weight on a high-fat diet than wild type mice did, even after remaining on a high-fat diet for a prolonged period of time. Mice are used to study the significance of certain chemicals on obesity. For example, mice were put on a high-fat diet, but given either tap water, green tea, or Goishi tea to drink. The mice who drank Goishi tea gained less weight and had less sugar in their blood than the mice who drank tap water and green tea. The researchers found that Goishi tea prevented the growth of adipocytes and prevented changes caused by tumor necrosis factor alpha and interleukin 6 when the mice were on a high fat diet. Another chemical studied to find an effect on obesity was propolis. To study the effects of the fungus, scientists injected it into mice while they were on an unrestricted high-fat diet. The researchers found that the mice injected with propolis had less adipose tissue, glucose, and cholesterol than the mice who were not administered propolis. Similar effects were seen in mice who were slowly introduced to propolis while on the high-fat diet.

Some species of mice are used in research because they have specific traits important for a study rather than for similarity to humans. For example, Apodemus chevrieri is used in studies of metabolism because the length of the day determines their metabolism instead of their diet. In studies with A. chevrieri, scientists found that even if metabolism is controlled by day length, the mice could still gain weight with a high-fat diet.

=== Rats ===
Rats have also been used in the diet-induced obesity model. Commonly used in medical research, rats were specifically chosen to study the diet-induced obesity model because of the features that they share with humans. One such characteristic is insulin resistance, which comes with diet-induced obesity in both rats and humans. Additionally, obesity remains in both species for long periods of time after it has initially set in. Because of the commonalities between the two, rats may prove to be helpful in the search for the cause of human obesity. For example, in one experiment, male Sprague-Dawley rats were given either a low fat or a high fat diet, with the high fat diet containing 35% more fat than the low fat diet. The results of the study illustrate that the high fat diet rats had a higher adiposity index than the low fat diet rats.

=== Dogs ===
Dogs are used for research because they can be domesticated, and because they have been used in studies concerning diabetes in the past. For example, dogs were used as subjects in a study of the effects of diet-induced obesity on insulin dispersion. In this experiment, it was found that a high-fat diet caused insulin resistance, contributing to cardiovascular disease, cancer, and type 2 diabetes.

== Research done with model ==
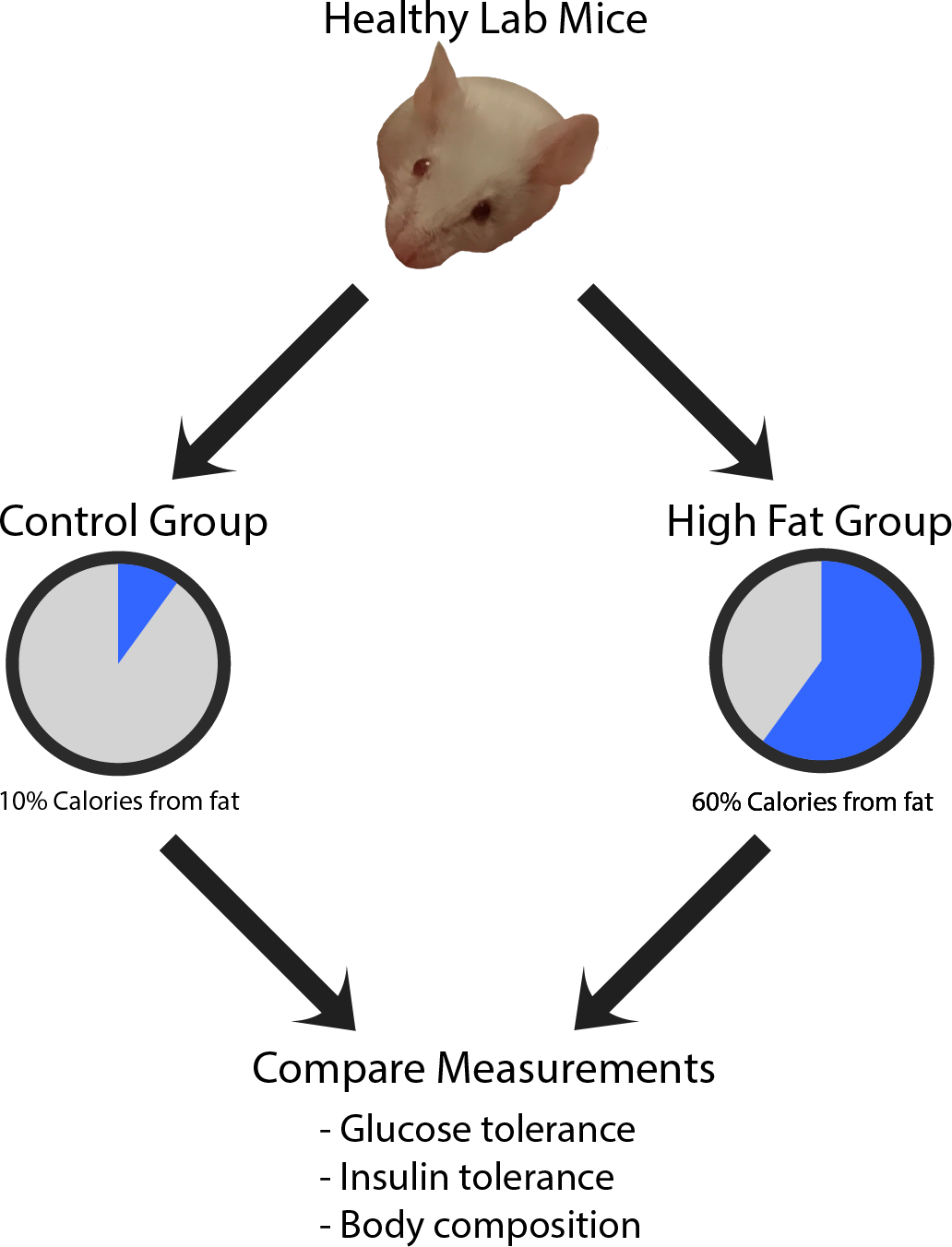
A summary of how a study on diet induced obesity in mice was performed

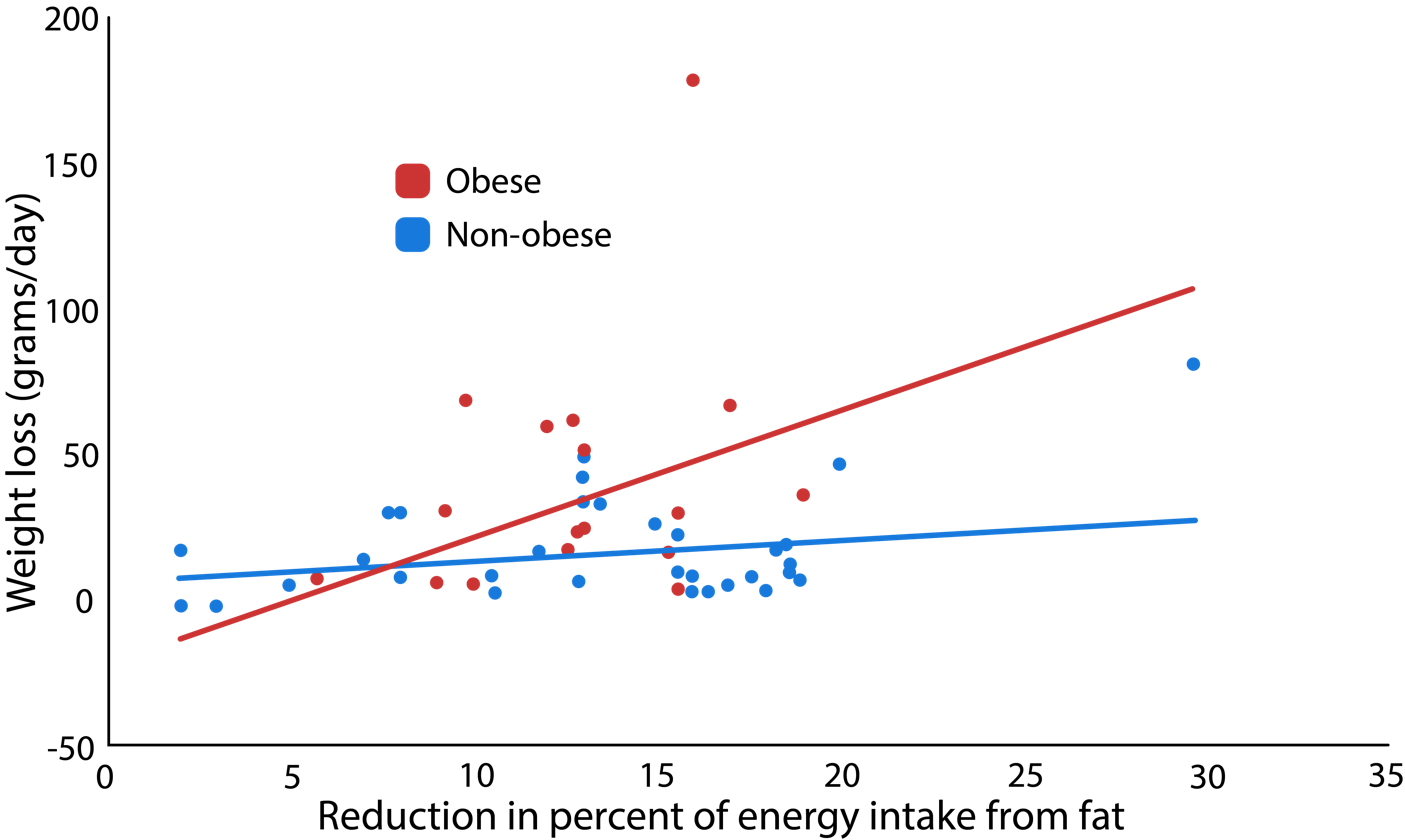
The results of a study on the effects of diet on obesity in people

=== Methodology ===
==== General methodology ====
As in most science experiments, a good experiment using the diet-induced obesity model has an experimental and a control group. The control group is given a diet with low percentage of total energy from fat (e.g. 10%), while the experimental group is given a diet with a high percentage of total energy from fat (e.g. 60%). The effect of the diet is quantified using the measures detailed below. Often, the experiment aims to see how obesity affects some other physiological or behavioral outcome, so other measures may be taken. Common such measures include stress (both physiological and psychological), changes in hormones, and insulin.

==== Measures of obesity ====
The outcome measure of obesity is usually either the gain of body weight or body fat. The body weight gain is quantified using the difference in the raw mass of the animal or in the Lee index (an index similar to the BMI in humans). The body fat gain is quantified either indirectly through the weight gain, or directly using dual-energy X-ray absorptiometry. When studying effects of obesity on diabetes, a fasting blood sugar test is also done before and after the diet.

==== Diets ====
Scientists have successfully induced obesity in animals using a wide range of diets. Although generally diets containing more than 30% of total energy from fat are considered to induce obesity, scientists have induced obesity with diets containing 13% to 85% of total energy from fat. The specific fatty foods used in the diets vary across studies, ranging from Crisco to lard to palm oil. Other researchers have shown that an animal diet more similar to the human Western diet (i.e. a diet with high-fat, high-sugar, high-salt, and low-fiber content) is more effective in inducing obesity and obesity-related disorders than a traditional high-fat diet.

=== Behavioral changes ===
Sensory stimulation from high-fat foods is one behavioral mechanism in the diet-induced obesity model—humans' and rats' neural proclivity for the texture, smell, and taste of high-fat foods stimulates "selection, consumption, digestion and absorption" of those foods. According to some studies, time, frequency, and quantity of feedings are other behavioral factors in the DIO model. Some research shows that nightly eating, low eating frequency, and large meal size may contribute to diet-induced obesity. Depression and long-term stress are also reported mechanisms contributing to obesity via increased food intake.

=== Physiological changes ===
Weight gain is the primary effect of diet-induced obesity, but there are a variety of additional physiological side effects. One such side effect is that the body gains more fat cells. The increased number of fat cells persists even after the diet becomes lower in fat. Weight put on during the high-fat diet also tends to persist. Changes in the composition of the body are accompanied by hormonal changes. High levels of leptin and insulin are produced; at the same time, the body becomes resistant to both. Insulin resistance in particular is fed by the addition of more fat cells.

== See also ==
- Diet and obesity
- History of model organisms
- History of animal testing
