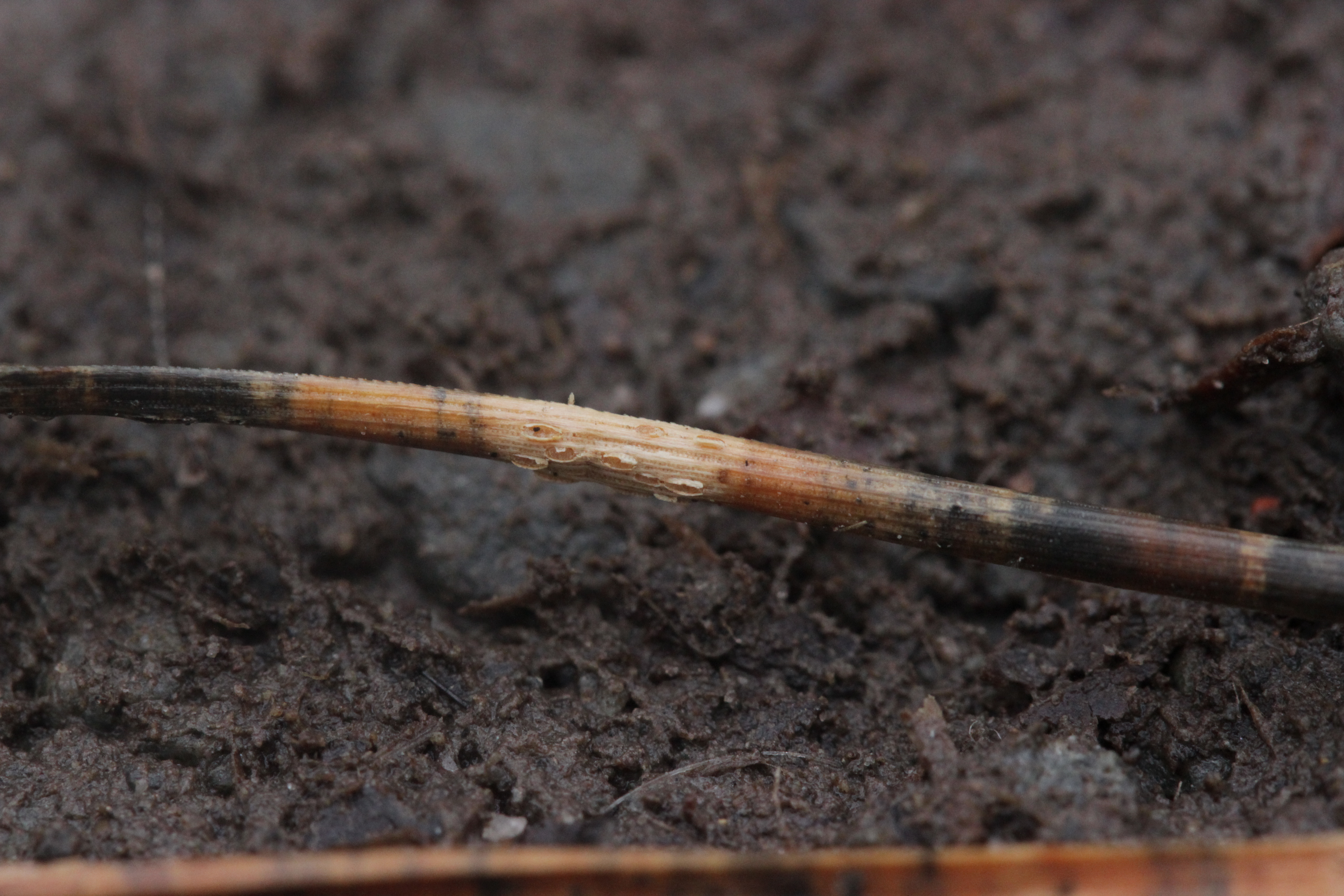
- Cyclaneusma niveum

Scientific classification
- Kingdom: Fungi
- Division: Ascomycota
- Class: Leotiomycetes
- Order: Chaetomellales
- Family: Marthamycetaceae

= Marthamycetaceae =

Family of fungi

Marthamycetaceae is a family of fungi belonging to the order Chaetomellales.

Genera:

- Cyclaneusma
- Marthamyces
- Melittosporiella Höhn.
- Mellitiosporium Corda
- Naemacyclus
- Phragmiticola Sherwood
- Propolina
- Propolis
- Ramomarthamyces
