= HLA A1-B8 haplotype =

Class I, A1-Cw7-B8
- HLA region on chromosome 6

Nicknames
- "HL A1,8; HL A1,A8; HLA A1-B8; HLA A*01-B*08, HLA A*01:01-B*08:01"

Loci
Loci	Gene	Allele	Serotype
HLA-F to HLA-A	HLA-F	*0101	-
HLA-F to HLA-A	HLA-G	*0101	-
HLA-F to HLA-A	HLA-A	*0101	A1
HLA-E	HLA-E	*0101	-
Cw-B	HLA-C	*0701	Cw7
HLA-B	*0801	B8

Nodes
- Population_{Maxima}: Western Ireland
- Freq._{Max}: >15.0%

Size and location
- Genes: -
- Chromosome: 6
- Location: 6p21.3
- Size (kbps): 1400

HLA A1-B8 (Also:HL A1,8; HL A1,A8; HLA A1-Cw7-B8; HLA A*01-B*08, HLA A*0101-B*0801, HLA A*0101-Cw*0701-B*0801; HLA A*01:01-C*07:01-B*08:01) is a multigene haplotype that covers the MHC Class I region of the human major histocompatibility complex on chromosome 6. A multigene haplotype is set of inherited alleles covering several genes, or gene-alleles; common multigene haplotypes are generally the result of identity by descent from a common ancestor (share a recent common ancestor for that segment of the chromosome). Chromosomal recombination fragments multigene haplotypes as the distance to that ancestor increases in number of generations.

The haplotype can be written in an extended form covering the major histocompatibility loci as follows:

HLA A*01:01 : Cw*07:01 : B*08:01

However, there are many other gene-alleles within the haplotype. In Europe A1-B8 is found, generally as part of the HLA A1-B8-DR3-DQ2 haplotype. This haplotype is 4.7 million nucleotides in length and the second longest haplotype identified within the human genome. In Africa A1-B8 and India A1-B8 is associated with other genes and other variants of A*01 and B*08

== Disease associations ==
Philosophically, A1-B8 is more than just two gene-alleles. These gene-alleles are markers for a haplotype, a stretch of chromosome 6 that contains many gene alleles. In its natural history this haplotype underwent some atypical selection, at the end of the period of evolution it became the predominant haplotypes in North/Western European ancestors. Today however the collection of genes is associated with increased incidences of certain diseases. Despite the fact that the associations have been known almost as long as A1 and "A8" were known, the role of factors affecting disease are still not clear.

=== A1-B8 and autoimmune diseases ===
A1-B8 serotype was associated with a number of diseases as "HL-A"' antigens were first being described. Among these were coeliac disease, autoimmune active chronic hepatitis, myasthenia gravis, Adrenocortical hyperfunction-Cushing's syndrome, primary biliary cirrhosis.

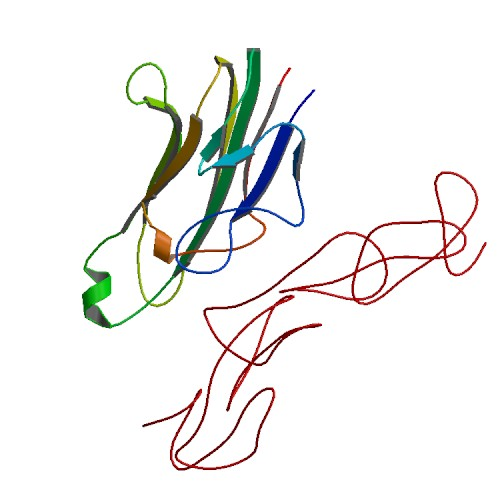
Lymphotoxin alpha is encoded with HLA A-B region

However, as study sizes increased and D serotypes were described in more detail, the association of these loci moved from the MHC class I loci to the MHC class II loci. Underlying this move was the HLA A1-B8-DR3-DQ2 haplotype, a haplotype that is in acute linkage disequilibrium in the European population. This disequilibrium made it appear that A1 and other class I gene-alleles were disease factors, when these alleles were only attached to a long segment of conserved DNA that had disease associated genes on the other end. In at least 2 diseases, the risk of autoimmune disease extends beyond the class II region of the haplotype.

==== Systemic lupus erythematosus ====
The "HL-A1,8 phenotype" was found to be associated with severe systemic lupus erythematosus (SLE) (renal and central nervous system involvement) in patients of European genetic ancestry. Two-point haplotype analysis between TNFB(B*01 allele) and HLA show that the allele is in linkage disequilibrium with HLA-A1, Cw7, B8, C4A(Null), DR3, DQ2.5.

==== Type 1 diabetes ====
While type 1 diabetes shows an extended association on the HLA A1-B8-DR3-DQ2 haplotype, the association appears not to extend beyond the HLA-B locus. A recent study of DR3-DQ2/DR4-DQ8 phenotype found that A1-cw7-B8 was actually lower than expected relative to other A-B types, indicating that risk associated genes are located between B8 and DR3. A*0101 appears to alter risk for type 1 diabetes but not Cw7-B8. The type 1 diabetes example shows the inherent difficulty in the use of linkage analysis alone to cipher risk.

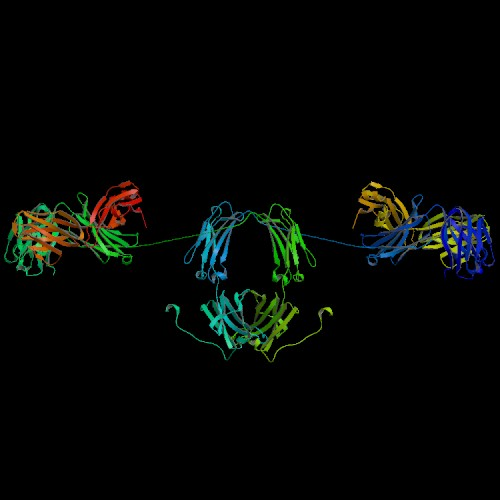
IgA-less or absent phenotype is associated with a number of inflammatory diseases

=== A1-B8 and allergic disease ===
In allergic disease A1,B8 were found to associate with allergic reactions in new-borns. A1, B8 was found increased in children with bronchial asthma and low IgA. However, some of this reaction can be attributed to the linkage of the HLA A1-B8-DR3-DQ2 haplotype to the IgA-less phenotype. A firmer association was found with atopies. A1,B8 where found more frequently in hay fever complicated by asthma or atopia relative to just hay fever. Further asthmatic patients with negative skin tests tended toward higher A1,B8 serotypes.

=== A1-B8 and infectious disease ===
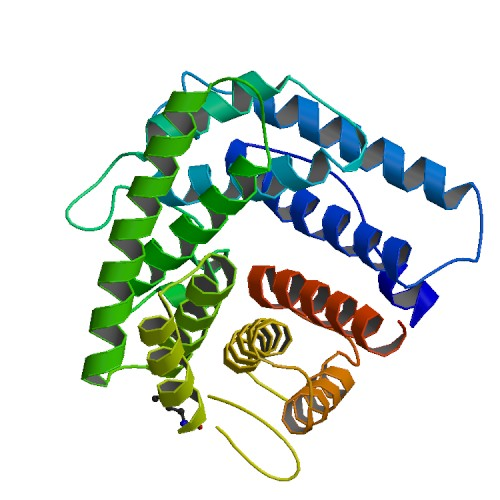
Complement 4A gene is deleted within A1-B8

==== HIV ====
In the mid-1980s the association with A1-B8-DR3 and HIV progression appeared shortly after the discover of the virus. A1-B8 associated with more rapid progression to seropositivity, and was strongly associated with a rapid decline in T4 cells and development of HIV-related symptoms within four years of infection. The strongest associations were seen with A1-Cw7-B8 haplotype. C4 (complement 4) produces a null allele at on locus C4AQ. This locus in part of the HLA A1-B8-DR3-DQ2 haplotype (markers are A1, CW7, B8, BfS, C4AQ0, C4B1, DR3, DQ2) therefore one study concluded that C4AQ0 could explain the increased infectivity to HIV. The haplotype was further linked to false-tumor splenomegaly, CD8 lymphocytosis, and high IgG.

==== Viral hepatitis ====
An association was seen between viral hepatitis and HLA-A1. Though, the association of A1 with autoimmune hepatitis with no anti-viral antibody was stronger than with chronic active hepatitis with anti-viral titer. The association with viral hepatitis was subsequently demonstrated and patients with antinuclear antibodies were more likely to have A1-B8-DR3. Currently studies point to association proximal the Cw*0702-B*0801 loci.

== Frequencies ==
HLA A1-B8 frequencies
Ireland	14.4		1
Slovak	11.9		1
Northern Ireland	11.5	^{1}	1
Swedish	11.5		1
Dutch Netherlands	9.8
Yugoslavian	9.7		1
British	9.7		1
Hungarian	9.4		1
CEPH France	8.5	^{1}	1
German	8.3		1
Czech	7.8		1
Swiss	6.7		3
Belgium	5.5		2
Austria	4.5		2
Tuscan Italy	4.3
Ukraine	4.3		3
Italy	4.2		1
Basque	4.2
Portuguese	4.2		2
Polish	4.0
Uganda	3.7	^{1}
Uralic	3.1		3
Spanish	2.8		4
Romania	2.8
Albania	2.5
Greek	2.3
Northern Greece	2.1
Crete	1.9
Luo Kenya	1.7	^{2}
Nandi Kenya	1.4	^{2}
Oman Arabia	1.4
Japanese	0.1
^{1}Cw*0701 (Eur.), ²Cw*0704 (Afr.)
