= LTBR =

LTBR may refer to:

- Lymphotoxin beta receptor, a cell surface receptor for lymphotoxin involved in apoptosis and cytokine release
- LTBR, the ICAO airport code for Yenişehir Airport, Bursa Province, Turkey
- Let There Be Rock, 1977 studio album by the Australian hard rock band AC/DC.
