= Lymphotoxin =

InterPro Family

lymphotoxin alpha (TNF superfamily, member 1)

Identifiers
- Symbol: LTA
- Alt. symbols: TNFB
- NCBI gene: 4049
- HGNC: 6709
- OMIM: 153440
- RefSeq: NM_000595
- UniProt: P01374

Other data
- Locus: Chr. 6 p21.3
Search for
- Structures: Swiss-model
- Domains: InterPro

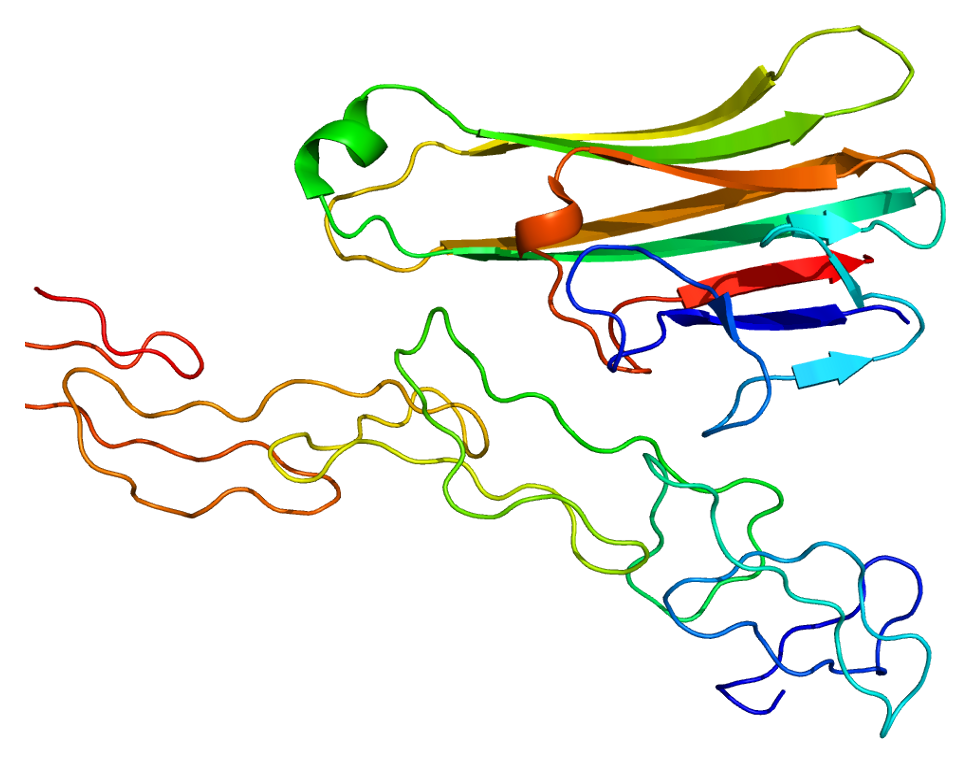
Structure of the LTA protein. Based on PyMOL rendering of PDB 1tnr.

Lymphotoxin is a member of the tumor necrosis factor (TNF) superfamily of cytokines, whose members are responsible for regulating the growth and function of lymphocytes and are expressed by a wide variety of cells in the body.

Lymphotoxin plays a critical role in developing and preserving the framework of lymphoid organs and of gastrointestinal immune responses, as well as in the activation signaling of both the innate and adaptive immune responses. Lymphotoxin alpha (LT-α, previously known as TNF-beta) and lymphotoxin beta (LT-β), the two forms of lymphotoxin, each have distinctive structural characteristics and perform specific functions.

== Structure and function ==
Each LT-α/LT-β subunit is a trimer and assembles into homotrimers or heterotrimers. LT-α binds with LT-β to form membrane-bound heterotrimers LT-α1-β2 and LT-α2-β1, which are commonly referred to as lymphotoxin beta. LT-α1-β2 is the most prevalent form of lymphotoxin beta. LT-α also forms a homotrimer, LT-α3, which is secreted by activated lymphocytes as a soluble protein.

Lymphotoxin is produced by lymphocytes upon activation and is involved with various aspects of the immune response, including inflammation and activation signaling. Upon binding to the LTβ receptor, LT-αβ transmits signals leading to proliferation, homeostasis and activation of tissue cells in secondary lymphoid organs through induced expression of chemokines, major histocompatibility complex, and adhesion molecules. LT-αβ, which is produced by activated Type 1 T helper cells (T_{h}1), CD8+ T cells, and natural killer (NK) cells, is known to have a major role in the normal development of Peyer's patches. Studies have found that mice with an inactivated LT-α gene (LTA) lack developed Peyer's patches and lymph nodes. In addition, LT-αβ is necessary for the proper formation of the gastrointestinal immune system.

=== Receptor binding and signaling activation ===
In general, lymphotoxin ligands are expressed by immune cells, while their receptors are found on stromal and epithelial cells.

The lymphotoxin homotrimer and heterotrimers are specific to different receptors. The LT-αβ complexes are the primary ligands for the lymphotoxin beta receptor (LTβR), which is expressed on tissue cells in multiple lymphoid organs, as well as on monocytes and dendritic cells. The soluble LT-α homotrimer binds to TNF receptors 1 and 2 (TNFR-1 and TNFR-2), and the herpesvirus entry mediator, expressed on T cells, dendritic cells, macrophages, and epithelial cells. There is also evidence that LTα3 signaling through TNFRI and TNFRII contributes to the regulation of IgA antibody in the gut.

Lymphotoxin administers a variety of activation signals in the innate immune response. LT-α is necessary for the expression of LT-α1-β2 on the cell surface as LT-α aids in the movement of LT-β to the cell surface to form LT-α1-β2. In the LT-α mediated signaling pathway, LT-α binds with LT-β to form the membrane-bound LT-α1-β2 complex. Binding of LT-α1-β2 to the LT-β receptor on the target cell can activate various signaling pathways in the effector cell such as the activation of the NF-κB pathway, a major signaling pathway that results in the release of additional pro-inflammatory cytokines essential for the innate response. The binding of lymphotoxin to LT-β receptors is essential for the recruitment of B cells and cytotoxic (CD8+) T cells to specific lymphoid sites to allow the clearing of antigen. Signaling of the LT-β receptors can also induce the differentiation of NK (natural killer) and NK-T cells, which are key players in the innate immune defense and in antiviral responses.

== Carcinogenic interactions ==
Lymphotoxin has cytotoxic properties that can aid in the destruction of tumor cells and promote the death of cancerous cells. The activation of LT-β receptors causes an up-regulation of adhesion molecules and directs B and T cells to specific sites to destroy tumor cells. Studies using mice with an LT-α knockout found increased tumor growth in the absence of LT-αβ.

However, some studies using cancer models have found that a high expression of lymphotoxin can lead to increased growth of tumors and cancerous cell lines. The signaling of the LT-β receptor may induce the inflammatory properties of specific cancerous cell lines, and that the elimination of LT-β receptors may hinder tumor growth and lower inflammation. Mutations in the regulatory factors involved in lymphotoxin signaling may increase the risk of cancer development. One major instance is the continuous initiation of the NF-κB pathway due to an excessive binding of the LT-α1-β2 complex to LT-β receptors, which can lead to specific cancerous conditions including multiple myeloma and melanoma. As excessive inflammation can result in cell damage and a higher risk of the growth of cancer cells, mutations that affect the regulation of LT-α pro-inflammatory signaling pathways can increase the potential for cancer and tumor cell development.

== See also ==
- Lymphotoxin beta receptor
- Tumor necrosis factor-alpha#Discovery
