= HLA-A1 =

Human leukocyte antigen serotype

- (MHC Class I, A cell surface antigen)
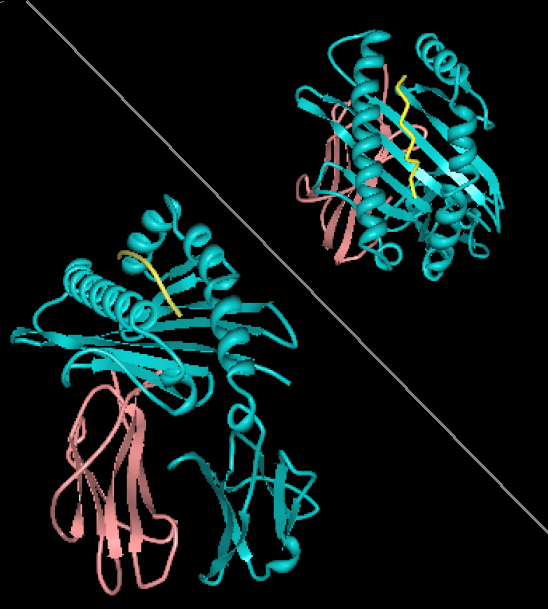
- Rendering of 1W72: α (A*01:01 gene product), β_{2}-microglobulin, and MAGE-1 peptide.

About
- Protein: transmembrane receptor/ligand
- Structure: αβ heterodimer
- Subunits: HLA-A*01--, β_{2}-microglobulin
- Older names: HL-A1

Subtypes
Subtype	allele	Available structures
A1	*01:01	1W72

Rare alleles
Subtype	allele	Available structures
A1.2	*01:02	
A1.3	*01:03	
- Alleles link-out to IMGT/HLA database at EBI

HLA-A1 (A1) is a human leukocyte antigen serotype within HLA-A "A" serotype group. The serotype is determined by the antibody recognition of α^{1} subset of HLA-A α-chains. For A1, the alpha "A" chain are encoded by the HLA-A*01 allele group and the β-chain are encoded by B2M locus. This group currently is dominated by A*01:01. A1 and A*01 are almost synonymous in meaning. A1 is more common in Europe than elsewhere, it is part of a long haplotype that appears to have been frequent in the ancient peoples of Northwestern Europe. A1 is a frequent component of the AH8.1 haplotype. A1 serotype positivity is roughly linked to a large number of inflammatory diseases and conditions believed to have immune system involvement. Because of its linkage within the AH8.1 haplotype many studies showed association with A1 or A1,B8 only later to show the association drift toward the class II region gene alleles, DR3 and DQ2.5. While it is not clear what role A1 has in infectious disease, some linkage with infection rates in HIV remain associated within the A1 region of the haplotype.

== Serotype ==
A1 recognition of some HLA A*01 gene products
A*01	A1	Sample
allele	%	size (N)
*01:01	99	5612
*01:02	95	129
*01:03	78	9

In all instances so far, HLA-A1 has been found to be linked to disease by association, but there are few that define HLA-A1 has a predominant genetic risk relative to other gene-alleles in the vicinity of the A1 gene on the larger haplotype.

=== A1 and autoimmune diseases ===
A1 serotype was associated with a number of diseases as "HL-A"' antigens were first being described. The associations rapidly expanded to include 'HL-A8' HLA-B8, as the HLA A1 and B8 were found to be commonly linked. As DRw3 was characterized, autoimmune risk drifted toward the class II region.

A1-B58 haplotype (A1-B17 where B58 is dominant) may remain associated with anti-neutrophil cytoplasmic antibody (ANCA)

==== A1 in diabetes ====
With the exception of type 1 diabetes, most of the evidence for direct association of A1 with autoimmune diseases evaporated as DR3 and DQ2 genes were characterized. While type 1 diabetes shows an extended association on the HLA A1-B8-DR3-DQ2 haplotype, the association appears not to extend beyond the HLA-B locus. A recent study of DR3-DQ2/DR4-DQ8 phenotype found that A1-cw7-B8 was actually lower than expected relative to other A-B types, indicating that risk associated genes are located between B8 and DR3. However a study elsewhere showed that A*01:01 appears to alter risk for type 1 diabetes but not Cw7-B8. The type 1 diabetes example shows the inherent difficulty in the use of linkage analysis alone to cipher risk.

=== A1 and allergic disease, sensitivities ===
Early in the study of HLA an association was found between HL A1,B8 in allergic disease, these are found to link to extended HLA A1-B8 region.

Oddly, A1 was also found associated with methotrexate-induced liver cirrhosis. Whereas A1 was found negatively associated with other disease such as coal workers pneumoconiosis and leprosy.

=== A1 and infectious disease ===
Within the early studies, A1 was found associate with or protected against some infectious diseases. Some diseases found associated with A1 actually link to the extended A1-B8 haplotype, viral induced hepatitis and accelerated progression of HIV are examples.

A1 with B8 showed an increase risk of measles infection, however, the significance was not consistent. A more recent paper showed an association of A*01:01 with lower than average responses to measles vaccine. With rubella, A1-B8 was more frequently found in people infected as a result of maternal transference. A1 was also found to associate with circumoral herpes. An association between A1 and cold sores was also described. Subsequently, the association for herpes simplex was also shown.

=== A1 in Lymphoma ===
In Hodgkin's lymphoma HLA-A1, but DR3 was not found higher. The A1-B8-DR3-DQ2 haplotype has a known association with Enteropathy-associated T-cell lymphoma, approximately 70% of patients are homozygotes for DQ2 with at least one copy of DR3-DQ2.

== Alleles ==
HLA A*01:01 frequencies
- Study population: Freq. (in %)
- Ireland South: 25.0
- England Lancaster: 21.5
- Wales: 21.1
- Ireland Northern: 20.2
- England Sheffield: 19.7
- England Liverpool: 19.4
- England Newcastle: 19.3
- Spain Basque Arratia Valley: 19.2
- England Leeds: 19.1
- England Manchester: 18.9
- Australia New South Wales: 18.7
- Australia West: 18.5
- Scotland Orkney: 17.0
- South Africa Natal Tamil: 17.0
- Belgium: 15.5
- Italy North (1): 15.4
- Israeli Jews: 15.2
- France South East: 15.0
- German Essen: 14.4
- Russia Arkhangelsk Pomors: 14.0
- Nador Metalsa (Berber): 13.7
- Sweden Stockholm: 13.6
- Spain Basque Gipuzkoa Pro…: 13.5
- Burkina Faso Fulani: 13.3
- Pakistan Sindhi: 13.3
- Serbia: 13.2
- Portugal Centre: 13.0
- Sweden Uppsala County: 13.0
- Czech Republic: 12.7
- India Andhra Pradesh Goll…: 12.5
- Israel Gaza Palestinians: 12.4
- India Mumbai Marathas: 12.3
- Tunisia: 12.3
- Algeria1: 12.3
- Romanian: 12.2
- Italy: 12.1
- Russia Northwest: 11.9
- Kenya Nandi: 11.8
- Spain Eastern Andalusia: 11.4
- Macedonia (4): 11.3
- Tunisia: 11.2
- Turkey (I): 10.9
- Spain North Cantabrian: 10.8
- Greece North: 10.0
- Croatia: 9.7
- Italy South Campania: 9.7
- Greece (3): 9.2
- Brazil: 9.1
- Finland: 8.9
- Saudi Arabia: 8.7
- Spain Catalonia Girona: 8.6
- Pakistan Karachi Parsi: 8.3
- Uganda Kampala: 8.3
- Mongolia Khalkha: 8.0
- Jordan Amman: 7.9
- Spain North Cabuernigo: 7.6
- Kenya Luo: 7.4
- Bulgaria: 7.3
- Russia Chuvash: 7.3
- Oman: 7.2
- Singapore Javanese Indone…: 7.0
- Georgia Tbilisi Kurds: 6.7
- France Corsica: 6.5
- Georgia Tbilisi Georgian…: 5.7
- Georgia Svaneti Svans: 5.6
- China Qinghai Hui: 5.5
- Australian Aborigine Cape…: 5.3
- Sudanese: 5.0
- Italy Sardinia(3): 4.5
- Russia Murmansk Saomi: 4.0
- Spain Pas Valley: 3.8
- Zambia Lusaka: 3.5
- Burkina Faso Rimaibe: 3.2
- Singapore Riau Malay: 3.2
- Kenya: 3.1
- Russia Nenets: 3.1
- Cameroon Bakola Pygmy: 3.0
- Thailand: 2.8
- Australian Aborigine Groo…: 2.7
- Senegal Niokholo Mandenka: 2.7
- Cameroon Bamileke: 2.6
- India Jalpaiguri Toto: 2.5
- China Shanghai: 2.4
- Thailand Northeast: 2.4

HLA A*01:02 frequencies
- Study population: Freq. (in %)
- India North Delhi: 3.3
- Kenya Nandi: 2.7
- Cape Verde Southeastern I…: 1.6
- Senegal Niokholo Mandenka: 1.6
- Mali Bandiagara: 1.1
- Tunisia: 1.0
- Guinea Bissau: 0.8
- Madeira: 0.8
- USA African Americans (3): 0.7
- Argentina Toba Rosario: 0.6
- USA Hispanic: 0.6
- Kenya Luo: 0.4
- Cameroon Beti: 0.3
- Russia Tuva (2): 0.3
- Uganda Kampala: 0.3

HLA A*01:03 frequencies
- Study population: Freq. (in %)
- Israel Ashkenazi and Non …: 2.1
- Kenya Nandi: 1.7
- Sudanese: 1.5
- Kenya: 0.7
- Saudi Arabia Guraiat and …: 0.7
- Iran Baloch: 0.6
- Ch. Guangdong Meizhou Han: 0.5
- China Beijing Shijiazhuan…: 0.2

Most of the disease risk conferred by A*01:01 are represented by either A1 serotype risks, or A1-B8 serotype risk (In Europe A1-B8 is almost always composed of A*01:01 and B*08:01). The other alleles, A*01:02 and A*01:03, may confer specific risks. For example, A*01:02 was found linked to a type of stroke seen frequently in children with sickle cell anemia.

There is a report that in the Somali communities within the US 2/3 of A1 bearers have the A*01:03 isoform.

== A1-B haplotypes ==
- A1-B8 Western Irish, N. Irish, Scottish, Wales, NW England, Scandinavia, Yugoslavia, Russia,....
- A1-B7 Armenia, Austria, NW Europe (regional recombinant between A1-B8 and A2/A3-B7)
- A1-B13 Uralic
- A1-B35 (Albania, Belgium, Italy, Greece, France - Eastern Mediterranean in origin)
- A1-B37 Yakuts, Tribal-India, Iyers-India, Mongolian, Indian, Orochon, Romanian, Yugoslavia, Korean, Albania, French, German, Manchu
- A1-B51 Yugoslavia, Germany, Iberia, Italy
- A1-B52 Bharghavas-India, Tribal-India, Italy, Iberia, France
- A1-B57 (See tables on discussion page)
- A1-B58 (See tables on discussion page)
