= Amylocarpus =

Scientific classification
- Kingdom: Fungi
- Division: Ascomycota
- Class: Leotiomycetes
- Order: Helotiales
- Genus: Amylocarpus; Curr.

Type species
- Amylocarpus encephaloides Curr.

Genus of fungi

Amylocarpus is a genus of fungi in the Helotiales order. The relationship of this taxon to other taxa within the order is unknown (incertae sedis), and it has not yet been placed with certainty into any family.
