= Pateclizumab =

Monoclonal antibody

Monoclonal antibody
- Type: Whole antibody
- Source: Humanized (from mouse)
- Target: lymphotoxin alpha

Clinical data
- Other names: MLTA3698A
- ATC code: none

Identifiers
- CAS Number: 1202526-59-7
- ChemSpider: none
- UNII: QOK1YYH7J2
- KEGG: D10187

Chemical and physical data
- Formula: C_{6436}H_{9910}N_{1710}O_{2004}S_{44}
- Molar mass: 144716.68 g·mol^{−1}

Pateclizumab (MLTA3698A) is an immunomodulator. It binds to lymphotoxin alpha.

This drug was developed by Genentech/Roche.
