= Eleutheromyces =

Scientific classification
- Domain: Eukaryota
- Kingdom: Fungi
- Division: Ascomycota
- Class: Leotiomycetes
- Order: Phacidiales
- Family: Helicogoniaceae
- Genus: Eleutheromyces; Fuckel

Genus of fungi

Eleutheromyces is a genus of fungi belonging to the family Helicogoniaceae.

The species of this genus are found in Europe and Northern America.

Species:

- Eleutheromyces longispora N.Maek. & Tsuneda
- Eleutheromyces pseudosubulatus Crous & A.Giraldo
- Eleutheromyces subulatus (Tode) Fuckel
