= Phragmiticola =

Scientific classification
- Kingdom: Fungi
- Division: Ascomycota
- Class: Leotiomycetes
- Order: Helotiales
- Family: incertae sedis
- Genus: Phragmiticola; Sherwood

Type species
- Phragmiticola rhopalospermum (Kirschst.) Sherwood

Genus of fungi

Phragmiticola is a genus of fungi in the Helotiales order. The relationship of this taxon to other taxa within the order is unknown (incertae sedis), and it has not yet been placed with certainty into any family.
