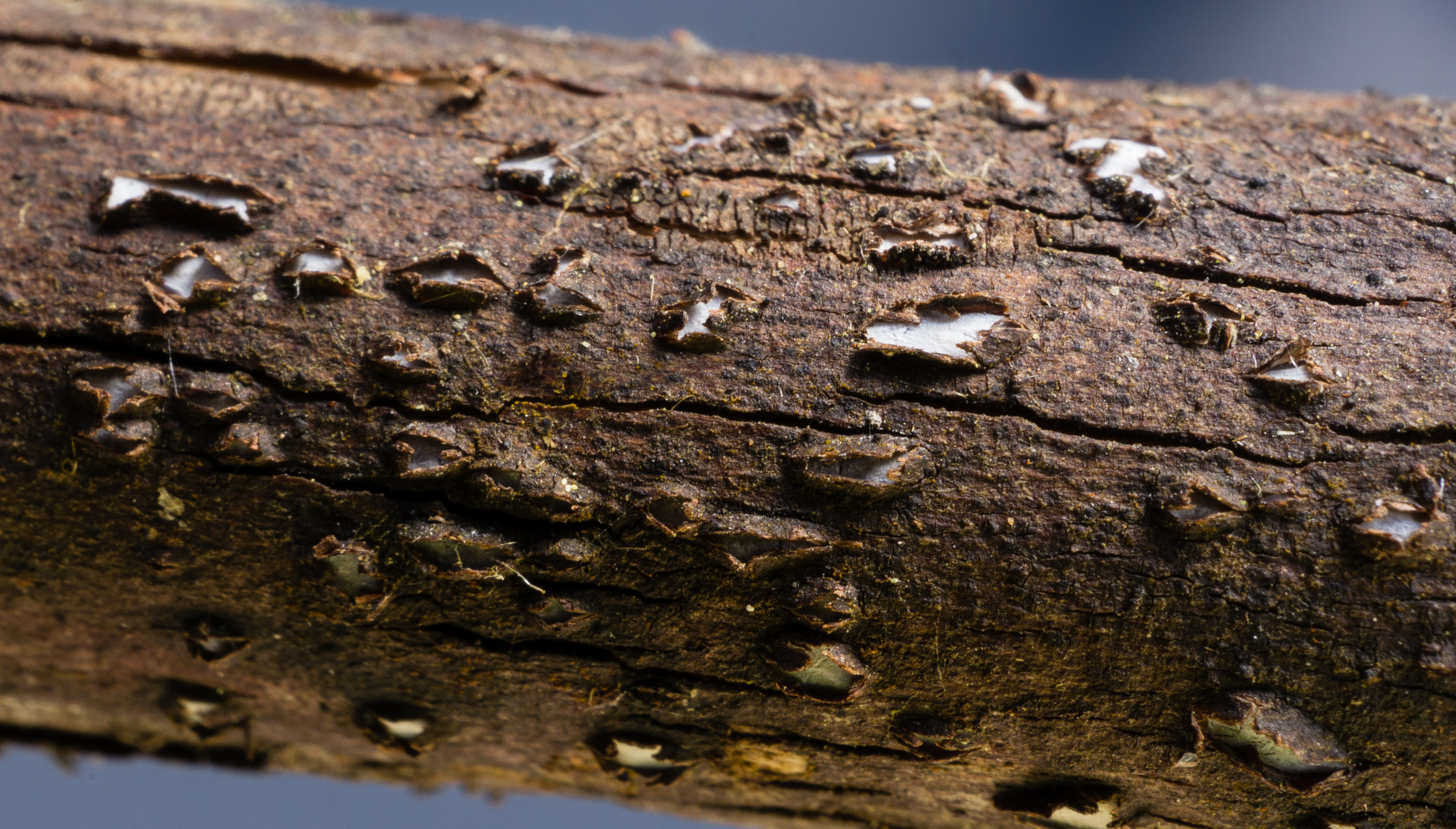
- Propolis versicolor growing on a decorticated madrone branch

Scientific classification
- Kingdom: Fungi
- Division: Ascomycota
- Class: Leotiomycetes
- Order: Chaetomellales
- Family: Marthamycetaceae
- Genus: Propolis (Fr.) Fr. non (Fr.) Corda (1838)

Type species
- Propolis phacidioides Fr. (1849)

Synonyms
- Propolomyces Sherwood (1977)

= Propolis (fungus) =

Genus of fungi

Propolis is a genus of fungus in the family Rhytismataceae. The genus contains about 14 species.

== Species ==
- Propolis angulosa
- Propolis farinosa
- Propolis hillmanniana
- Propolis lecanora
- Propolis leonis
- Propolis lugubris
- Propolis phacidioides
- Propolis pulchella
