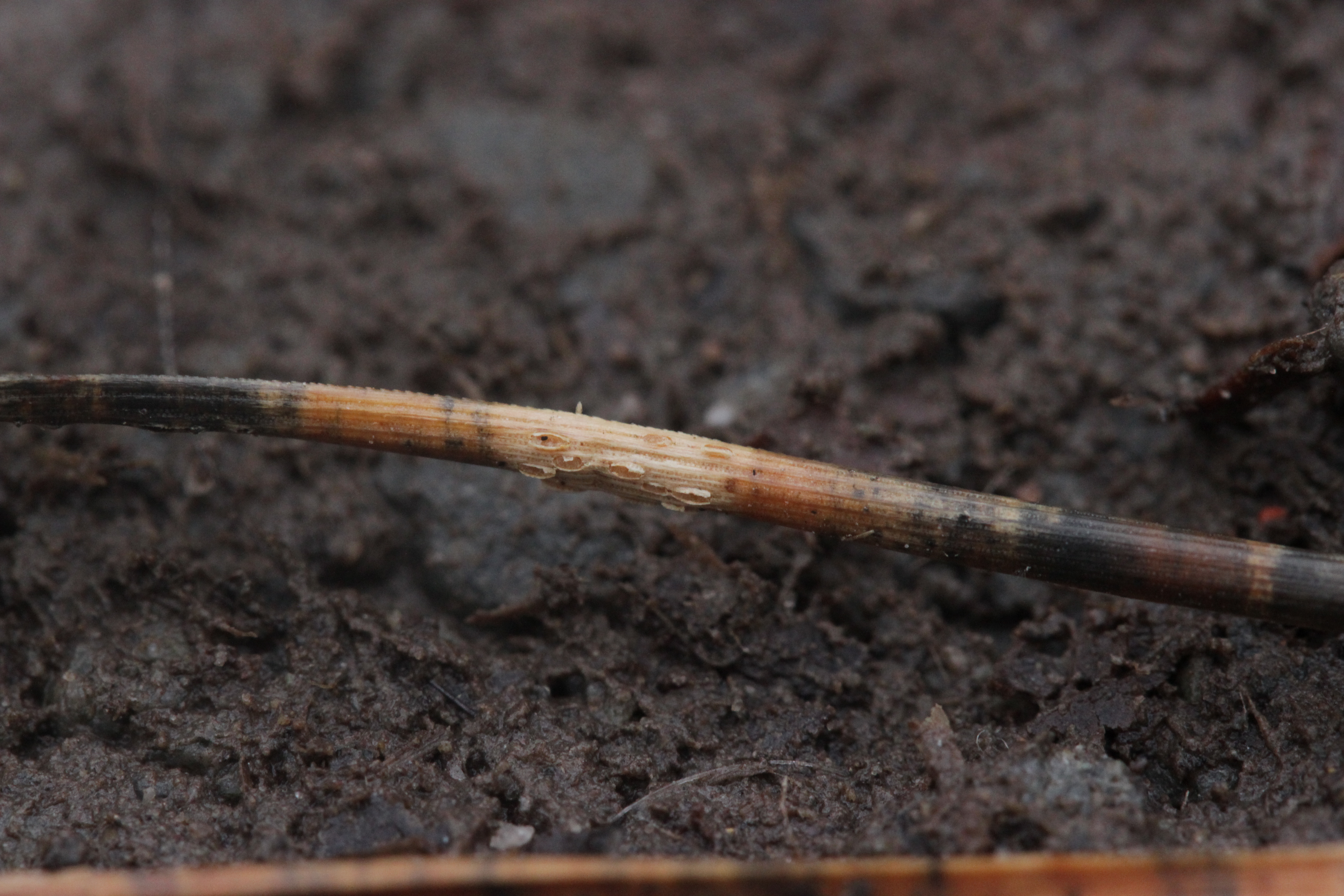
- Cyclaneusma niveum

Scientific classification
- Domain: Eukaryota
- Kingdom: Fungi
- Division: Ascomycota
- Class: Leotiomycetes
- Order: Chaetomellales
- Family: Marthamycetaceae
- Genus: Cyclaneusma; DiCosmo, Peredo, & Minter

= Cyclaneusma =

Genus of fungi

Cyclaneusma is a genus of fungi belonging to the family Marthamycetaceae.

The genus has cosmopolitan distribution.

Species:

- Cyclaneusma minus (Butin) DiCosmo, Peredo & Minter
