= Lymphotoxin alpha =

Protein found in humans

LTA
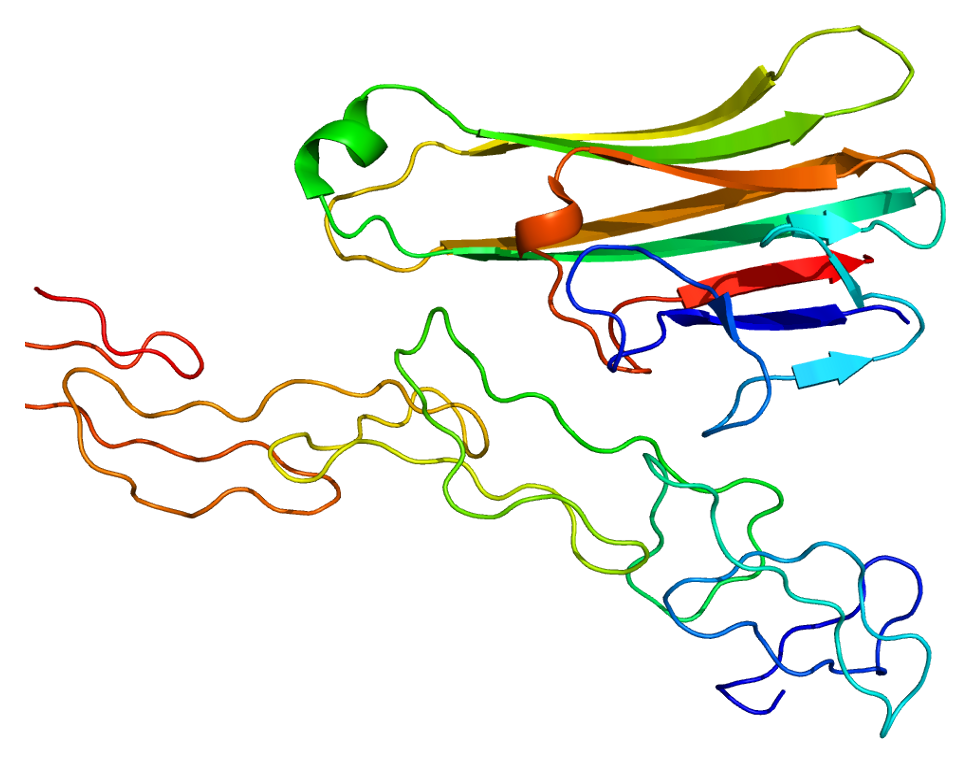

Identifiers
- Aliases: LTA, LT, TNFB, TNFSF1, Lymphotoxin alpha, TNLG1E
- External IDs: OMIM: 153440; MGI: 104797; GeneCards: LTA
Available structures
PDB	Ortholog search: PDBe RCSB
PDB	List of PDB id codes 1TNR, 4MXV, 4MXW

Gene location (Human)
Chr.	Chromosome 6 (human)
Band	6p21.33	Start	31,572,054 bp
Band	6p21.33	End	31,574,324 bp

Gene location (Mouse)
Chr.	Chromosome 17 (mouse)
Band	17 B1|17 18.59 cM	Start	35,422,141 bp
Band	17 B1|17 18.59 cM	End	35,424,327 bp
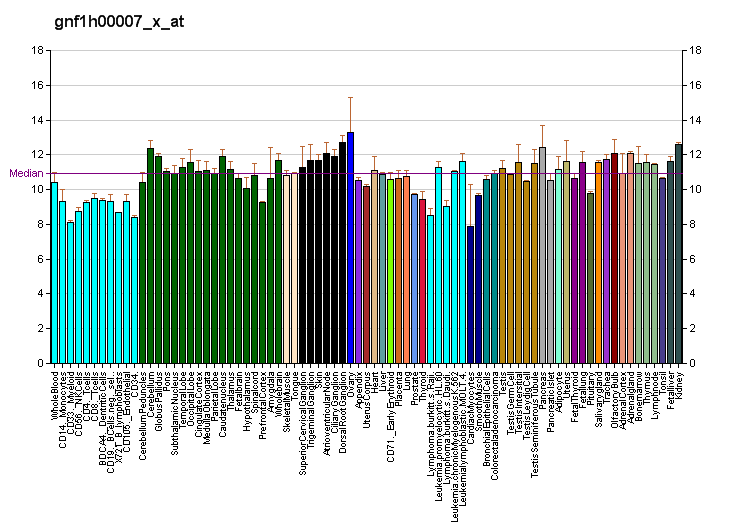

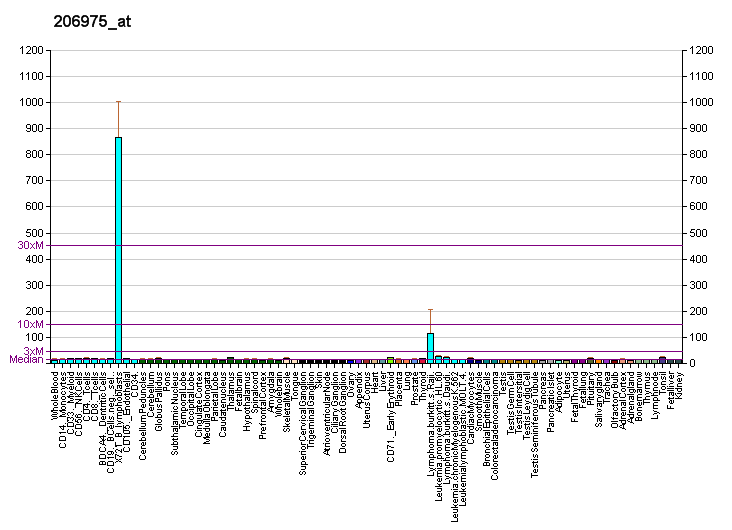
RNA expression pattern
Bgee	Human / Mouse (ortholog); Top expressed in: testicle; granulocyte; lymph node; blood; appendix; spleen; right testis; left testis; tonsil; bone marrow / Top expressed in: spleen; white pulp; embryo; embryo; thymus; cortex of thymus; granulocyte; medulla of thymus; colon; muscle of thigh; More reference expression data
BioGPS	More reference expression data
Gene ontology
Molecular function	cytokine activity; tumor necrosis factor receptor binding; signaling receptor binding; protein binding
Cellular component	membrane; plasma membrane; extracellular region; extracellular space
Biological process	positive regulation of chronic inflammatory response to antigenic stimulus; response to hypoxia; response to nutrient; cell-cell signaling; positive regulation of humoral immune response mediated by circulating immunoglobulin; positive regulation of interferon-gamma production; tumor necrosis factor-mediated signaling pathway; response to lipopolysaccharide; humoral immune response; immune response; positive regulation of apoptotic process; lymph node development; positive regulation of glial cell proliferation; negative regulation of fibroblast proliferation; signal transduction; defense response to Gram-positive bacterium; apoptotic process; regulation of signaling receptor activity
Sources:Amigo / QuickGO
Orthologs
Databases	NCBI: entry; OMA: entry
Species	Human	Mouse
Entrez	4049	16992
Ensembl	ENSG00000231408; ENSG00000223919; ENSG00000173503; ENSG00000226275; ENSG00000230279 ENSG00000238130; ENSG00000226979	ENSMUSG00000024402
UniProt	P01374	P09225
RefSeq (mRNA)	NM_000595; NM_001159740	NM_010735
RefSeq (protein)	NP_000586; NP_001153212	NP_034865
Location (UCSC)	Chr 6: 31.57 – 31.57 Mb	Chr 17: 35.42 – 35.42 Mb
PubMed search
- Wikidata
View/Edit Human	View/Edit Mouse

Lymphotoxin-alpha (LT-α) formerly known as tumor necrosis factor-beta (TNF-β) is an immune signalling protein (a cytokine) that in humans is encoded by the LTA gene. LT-α is mainly produced by activated lymphocytes, with particularly strong expression by certain T cell and B cell subsets. It exhibits anti-proliferative activity and causes the cellular destruction of tumor cell lines. As a cytotoxic protein, LT-α performs a variety of important roles in immune regulation depending on the form that it is secreted as. Unlike other members of the TNF superfamily, in soluble form LT-α is only found as a homotrimer. At the cell surface it is found only as a heterotrimer with the membrane-anchored protein LTβ.

LT-α has a significant impact on the maintenance of the immune system including the development of secondary lymphoid organs. Absence of LT-α leads to the disruption of gastrointestinal development, prevents Peyer's patch development, and results in a disorganized spleen.

As a signaling molecule, LT-α is involved in the regulation of cell survival, proliferation, differentiation, and apoptosis. LT-α plays an important role in innate immune regulation and its presence has been shown to prevent tumor growth and destroy cancerous cell lines. In contrast, unregulated expression of LT-α can result in a constantly active signaling pathway, thus leading to uncontrolled cellular growth and creation of tumors. Hence depending on the context, LT-α may function to prevent growth of cancer cells or facilitate the development of tumors. Furthermore, LT-α effects depend on the type of organ it acts upon, type of cancer cells, cellular environment, gender, and time of effect during an immune response.

== Gene ==
The human gene encoding for LT-α was cloned in 1985. The gene of LT-α is located on chromosome 6 and is in close proximity of the gene encoding major histocompatibility complex.

== Structure ==
LT-α is translated as a 25 kDa glycosylated polypeptide with 171 amino acid residues. Furthermore, human LT-α is 72% identical to mouse LT-α at the protein's primary sequence.

LTα expression is highly inducible and when secreted, forms a soluble homotrimeric molecule. LT-α can also form heterotrimers with lymphotoxin-beta, which anchors lymphotoxin-alpha to the cell surface. The interaction between LT-α and LT-β results in the formation of a membrane bound complex (LT-α_{1}-β_{2}).

== Function ==
Lymphotoxin alpha, a member of the tumor necrosis factor superfamily, is a cytokine produced by lymphocytes. It occurs as soluble homotrimer (LT-α_{3}) and as membrane-bound heterotrimer (LT-α_{1}-β_{2}) with LT-β. Soluble LT-α_{3} binds TNFR1 and TNFR2 and can induce apoptosis or growth arrest in sensitive target cells, contribute to anti-tumor and antiviral cytotoxicity, and promote inflammatory cytokine production via NF-κB signaling. Membrane LT-α_{1}-β_{2} signals through LT-β receptors and is crucial for lymphoid organogenesis, maintenance of secondary lymphoid tissues (lymph nodes, Peyer’s patches), and formation of tertiary lymphoid structures in chronic inflammation. Absence of LT-β on the lymphocyte cell surface will diminish the ability of LT-α to form LT-α_{1}-β_{2}, thus decreasing its effective ability as a cytokine.

LT-α mediates a large variety of inflammatory, immunostimulatory, and antiviral responses in target cells. LT-α is also involved in the formation of secondary lymphoid organs during development and plays a role in apoptosis. In LT-α knockout mice, Peyer's patches and lymph nodes will fail to develop, thus illustrating the cytokine's essential role in immunological development.

As a cytotoxic protein, LT-α causes the destruction of cancerous cell lines, activates signaling pathways, and effectively kills transformed tumor cells. However, mice with overexpression of LT-α or LT-β showed increased tumor growth and metastasis in several models of cancer. In other studies, mice with gene knockout of LT-α showed enhanced tumor growth, implicating possible protective role of LT-α in cancer. However, these studies utilized mice with complete LT-α deficiency that did not allow to distinguish effects of soluble versus membrane-associated LT.

=== LT-α mediated signaling pathway ===
As a member of the TNF family, LT-α binds to various receptors and activates the NF-κB pathway, thus promoting immune regulation through the innate immune response. In order for activation via LT-β receptor to occur, LT-α must form a complex with LT-β to form the LT-α_{1}-β_{2} complex in the plasma membrane of the lymphocyte. Formation of LT-α_{1}-β_{2} complex enables binding to LT-β receptors on target cells and subsequent activation of signaling pathways. Activation of signaling pathways such as NF-κB ultimately leads to various cellular fates, including cell proliferation and cell death. After LT-β receptor activation, IKK-α, β, and γ are produced, which increases degradation of I-κB, an inhibitor of NF-kB, and produce NF-kB1 (p50) and ReIA (p60). The production of NF-kB1 and ReIA increases rates of gene transcription of cytokines and inflammatory-inducing molecules.

=== Anti-carcinogenic properties ===
Activation of LT-β receptors is capable of inducing cell death of cancerous cells and suppressing tumor growth. The process of cell death is mediated by the presence of IFN-γ and can involve apoptotic or necrotic pathways. It is seen that LT-β receptors facilitate the upregulation of adhesion molecules and recruit lymphocytes to tumor cells to combat tumor growth. In other words, LT-α interactions with LT-β receptors can increase anti-tumor effects through direct destruction of tumor cells.

=== Pro-carcinogenic properties ===
However, recent studies have shown the contribution of LT-α mediated signaling to the development of cancer. As mentioned previously, LT-α signaling can promote inflammatory responses, but prolonged inflammation can cause serious cellular damage and increase the risk of certain diseases including cancer. Thus, mutations in regulatory factors in LT-α signaling pathways can promote cell signaling disruptions and encourage the creation of cancerous cell lines. One of these mutations includes constant binding of LT-α_{1}-β_{2} complex to LT-β receptors, which results in the constant activation of the NF-κB alternative pathway. Presence of a constitutively active NF-κB pathway manifests in multiple myeloma and other cancer-related diseases. Removal of LT-β receptors has shown to inhibit tumor growth and decrease angiogenesis. Thus, lymphotoxin and its downstream signaling via the NF-κB pathway illustrate the cytokine's influence on tumor development and metastasis.

A fully humanized anti-LT-α antibody (Pateclizumab or MLTA3698A) has been shown to react with both LT-α and LT-β. Clinical trials involving this antibody have yet to be employed, but the creation of this antibody offers alternative inhibitory methods for the NF-κB pathway.

== Effects on gastrointestinal system ==
During embryonic development, LT-α signaling plays an active part in the formation of the gastrointestinal immune system. In particular, LT-α mediated signaling is responsible for the development of intestinal lymphoid structures such as Peyer’s patches. This intestinal lymphoid follicle plays an important role in the immune system of the digestive tract.

Peyer’s patches are highly specialized lymphoid nodules located in the intestine. They are surrounded by follicle-associated epithelium and are able to interact with other immune cells through the transcytosis of foreign antigens. In addition to this function, Peyer’s patches facilitate the production Ig-A producing immunocytes, thus increasing the efficacy of the adaptive immune system.

The development of Peyer’s patches requires the binding and activation of LT-β receptor with LT-α_{1}-β_{2} complex. Experiments involving transgenic mice have shown that the absence of LT-α resulted in the lack of Peyer’s patches and other lymph nodes. The lack of Peyer’s patches and other lymph nodes have also been shown to reduce levels of Ig-A. Being the most produced immunoglobulin, Ig-A protects against mucosal pathogens by regulating bacterial growth and inhibiting antigen adhesion to the intestine under normal conditions. Reduced levels of Ig-A greatly diminishes gut immune regulation and deregulate protection against microbes, thereby emphasizing the importance of LT-mediated response for the expression of Ig-A.

== Nomenclature ==
Discovered by Granger and his research group in 1968, LT-alpha was known as lymphotoxin. As years progressed, its name was changed to tumor necrosis factor-beta (TNF-β). Later discovery of LT-β and LT-α_{1}-β_{2} complex prompted the disposal of TNF-β and the subdivision of LT into two classes: LT-α and LT-β.

== Interactions ==
Lymphotoxin alpha has been shown to interact with LTB.

== See also ==
- Lymphotoxin
