= Tumor necrosis factor superfamily =

Protein superfamily

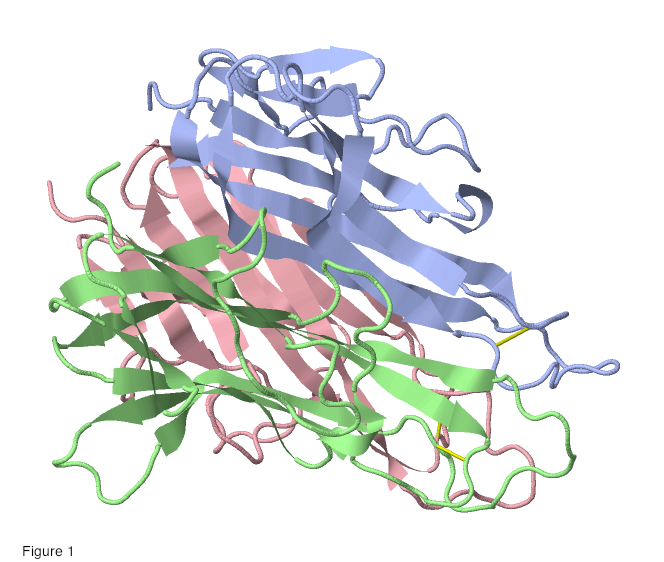
- Trimeric structure of TNF alpha, produced by Mus musculus, based on PDB structure 2TNF (1.4 Å Resolution). Different colors represent different monomers. Baeyens, KJ et al. (1999). Figure rendered using FirstGlance Jmol.

Identifiers
- Symbol: TNF
- Pfam: PF00229
- InterPro: IPR006052
- PROSITE: PDOC00224
- SCOP2: 1tnf / SCOPe / SUPFAM
- OPM superfamily: 292
- OPM protein: 2hew
- Membranome: 80
Available protein structures:
- PDB: IPR006052 PF00229 (ECOD; PDBsum)
- AlphaFold: IPR006052; PF00229

TNF
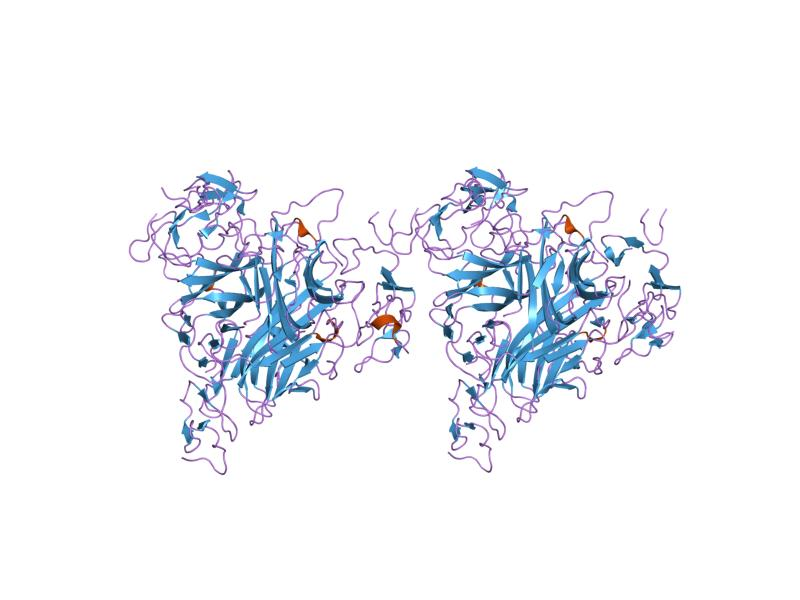
- crystal structure of trail-sdr5

Identifiers
- Symbol: TNF
- Pfam: PF00229
- Pfam clan: CL0100
- ECOD: 10.3.1
- InterPro: IPR006052
- PROSITE: PDOC00561
- SCOP2: 1tnr / SCOPe / SUPFAM
Available protein structures:
- PDB: IPR006052 PF00229 (ECOD; PDBsum)
- AlphaFold: IPR006052; PF00229

The tumor necrosis factor (TNF) superfamily is a protein superfamily of type II transmembrane proteins containing TNF homology domain and forming trimers. Members of this superfamily can be released from the cell membrane by extracellular proteolytic cleavage and function as a cytokine. These proteins are expressed predominantly by immune cells and they regulate diverse cell functions, including immune response and inflammation, but also proliferation, differentiation, apoptosis and embryogenesis.

The superfamily contains 19 members that bind to 29 members of TNF receptor superfamily. An occurrence of orthologs in invertebrates hints at ancient origin of this superfamily in evolution.

The PROSITE pattern of this superfamily is located in a beta sheet in the central section of the protein that is conserved across all members.

== Members ==
There are 19 family members, numerically classified as TNFSF#, where # denotes the member number, sometimes followed by a letter.

TNFSF#	Name	Synonyms	Gene	Function
1	Lymphotoxin alpha	TNFβ, TNFSF1B	LTA	Induction of inflammation and antiviral response, development of secondary lymphoid organs, role in tumorigenesis
2	Tumor necrosis factor	TNFα, Dif, Necrosin, TNFSF1A, ...	TNF	Regulation of immune cells, induction of fever, cachexia, inflammation and apoptosis, inhibition of tumorigenesis and viral replication and response to sepsis
3	Lymphotoxin beta	TNFγ	LTB	Induction of inflammation and antiviral response, development of secondary lymphoid organs, role in tumorigenesis
4	OX40 ligand	CD252, Gp34, CD134L	TNFSF4	Activation of T cell immune response by T cell costimulation
5	CD40 ligand	CD154, TRAP, Gp39, T-BAM	CD40LG	Regulation of adaptive immune response by activating antigen-presenting cell
6	Fas ligand	CD178, APTL, CD95L	FASLG	Regulation of T cell homeostasis by induction of apoptosis
7	CD27 ligand	CD70	CD70	Regulation of B cell activation and T cell homeostasis
8	CD30 ligand	CD153	TNFSF8	Induction of apoptosis of T cells and B cells, prevention of autoimmunity
9	CD137 ligand	4-1 BBL	TNFSF9	
10	TNF-related apoptosis-inducing ligand	CD253, APO-2L	TNFSF10	Inhibition of tumorigenesis, induction of apoptosis
11	Receptor activator of nuclear factor kappa-Β ligand	CD254, OPGL, TRANCE, ODF	TNFSF11	Tissue growth (particularly bone regeneration and remodeling), dendritic cell maturation
12	TNF-related weak inducer of apoptosis	APO-3L, DR3L	TNFSF12	Regulation of angiogenesis, induction of apoptosis
13	A proliferation-inducing ligand	CD256, TALL-2, TRDL1	TNFSF13	Regulation of B cell development and plasma cell survival
13B	B-cell activating factor	CD257, BLyS, TALL-1, TNFSF20, ...	TNFSF13B	Stimulation of B cell proliferation and differentiation
14	LIGHT	CD258, HVEML	TNFSF14	Stimulation of T cell proliferation, apoptosis regulation
15	Vascular endothelial growth inhibitor	TL1, TL-1A	TNFSF15	Inhibition of angiogenesis
18	TNF superfamily member 18	GITRL, AITRL, TL-6	TNFSF18	Regulation of T cell survival
19	Ectodysplasin A	ED1-A1, ED1-A2	EDA	Development of ectodermal tissues
