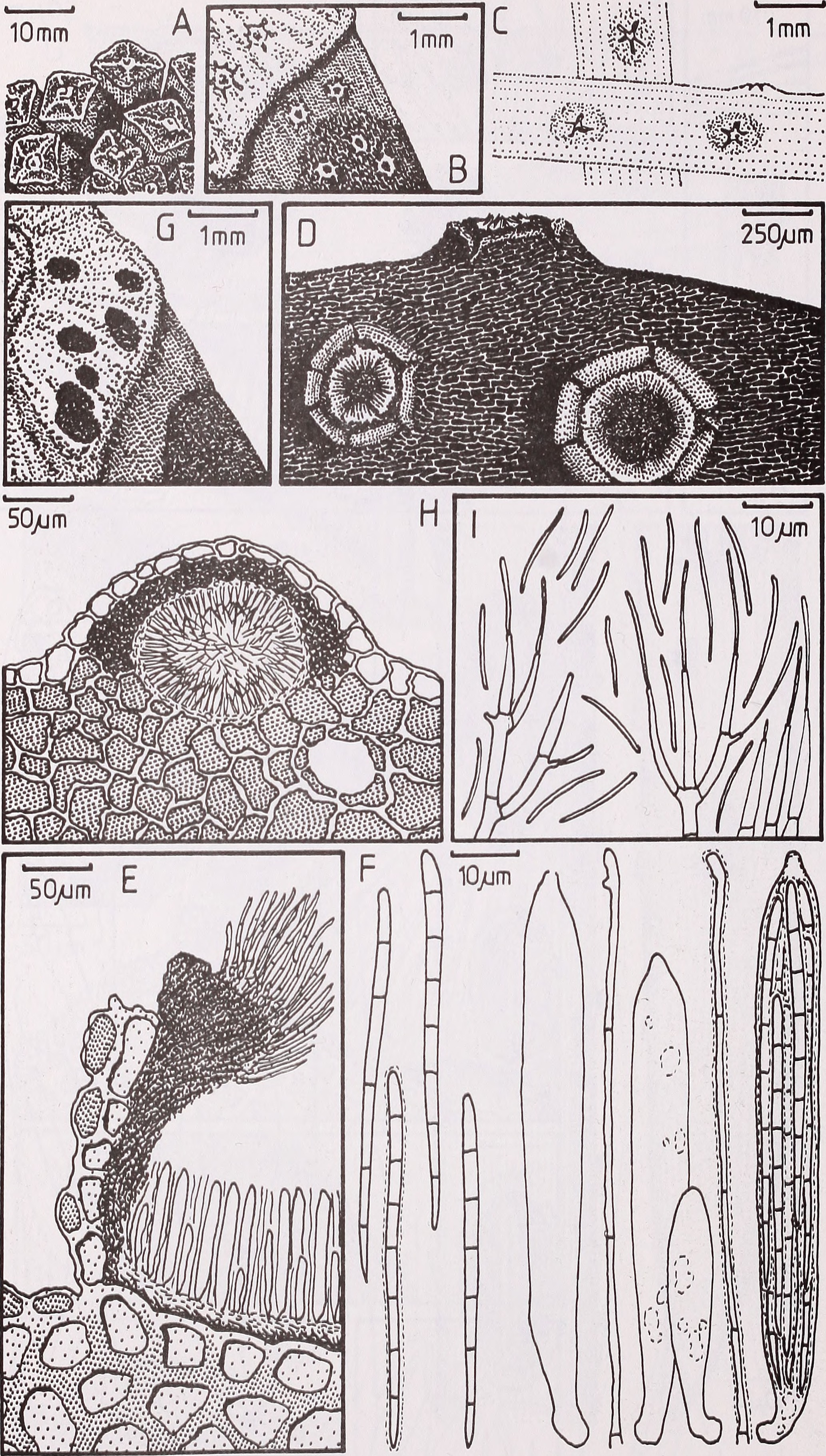
- Naemacyclus fimbriatus

Scientific classification
- Kingdom: Fungi
- Division: Ascomycota
- Class: Leotiomycetes
- Order: Helotiales
- Family: incertae sedis
- Genus: Naemacyclus; Fuckel

Type species
- Naemacyclus pinastri (Lacroix) Fuckel

= Naemacyclus =

Genus of fungi

Naemacyclus is a genus of fungi in the Helotiales order. The relationship of this taxon to other taxa within the order is unknown (incertae sedis), and it has not yet been placed with certainty into any family.
