= Lymphotoxin beta =

Protein-coding gene in the species Homo sapiens

LTB

Identifiers
- Aliases: LTB, TNFC, TNFSF3, p33, Lymphotoxin beta, TNLG1C
- External IDs: OMIM: 600978; MGI: 104796; GeneCards: LTB
Available structures
| PDB | Ortholog search: PDBe RCSB |
| PDB | List of PDB id codes 4MXW |

Gene location (Human)
| Chr. | Chromosome 6 (human) |
| Band | 6p21.33 | Start | 31,580,525 bp |
| Band | 6p21.33 | End | 31,582,522 bp |

Gene location (Mouse)
| Chr. | Chromosome 17 (mouse) |
| Band | 17 B1|17 18.59 cM | Start | 35,413,415 bp |
| Band | 17 B1|17 18.59 cM | End | 35,415,296 bp |
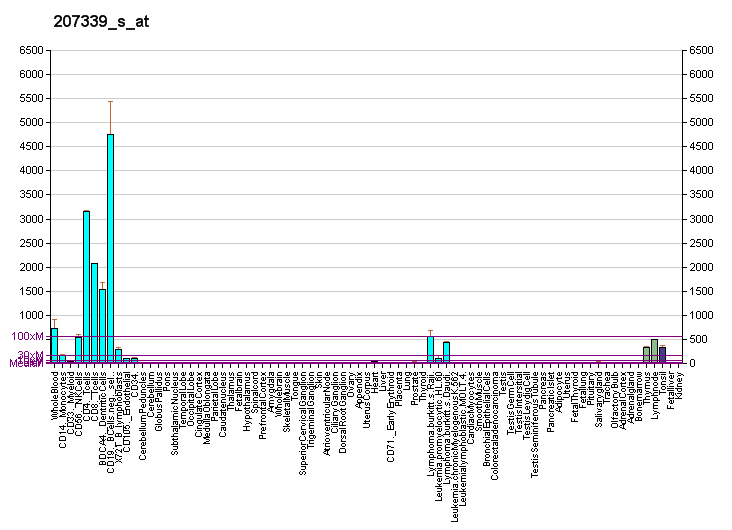
RNA expression pattern
| Bgee | Human / Mouse (ortholog); Top expressed in: granulocyte; spleen; lymph node; blood; appendix; mucosa of transverse colon; monocyte; testicle; bone marrow; bone marrow cell / Top expressed in: spleen; granulocyte; thymus; bone marrow; white pulp; embryo; jejunum; colon; ileum; embryo; More reference expression data |
| BioGPS | More reference expression data |
Gene ontology
| Molecular function | tumor necrosis factor receptor binding; cytokine activity; signaling receptor binding |
| Cellular component | integral component of membrane; plasma membrane; membrane; extracellular space; cellular component |
| Biological process | cell-cell signaling; tumor necrosis factor-mediated signaling pathway; lymph node development; gene expression; immune response; signal transduction; skin development; regulation of signaling receptor activity |
Sources:Amigo / QuickGO
Orthologs
| Databases | NCBI: entry; OMA: entry |
| Species | Human | Mouse |
| Entrez | 4050 | 16994 |
| Ensembl | ENSG00000223448; ENSG00000238114; ENSG00000236925; ENSG00000231314; ENSG00000204487 ENSG00000236237; ENSG00000227507; ENSG00000206437 | ENSMUSG00000024399 |
| UniProt | Q06643 | P41155 |
| RefSeq (mRNA) | NM_009588; NM_002341 | NM_008518 |
| RefSeq (protein) | NP_002332; NP_033666 | NP_032544 |
| Location (UCSC) | Chr 6: 31.58 – 31.58 Mb | Chr 17: 35.41 – 35.42 Mb |
| PubMed search |
- Wikidata
| View/Edit Human | View/Edit Mouse |

Lymphotoxin-beta (LT-beta) formerly known as tumor necrosis factor C (TNF-C) is a protein that in humans is encoded by the LTB gene.

== Structure ==
Lymphotoxin-beta (LTB) is a type II membrane protein belonging to the TNF family. It forms heterotrimers with lymphotoxin-alpha, anchoring it to the cell surface. The predominant complex found on the surface of lymphocytes is the lymphotoxin-alpha 1/beta 2 complex (i.e., one molecule of alpha and two molecules of beta), which serves as the primary ligand for the lymphotoxin-beta receptor. A less common form is the lymphotoxin-alpha 2/beta 1 complex. Additionally, alternative splicing of the LTB gene results in multiple transcript variants encoding different isoforms. Notably, the lymphotoxin-beta isoform b cannot form a complex with lymphotoxin-alpha, indicating it may have functions independent of lymphotoxin-alpha.

== Function ==
LTB plays a critical role in immune system regulation. It is an inducer of the inflammatory response and is essential for the normal development of lymphoid tissues. The membrane-bound lymphotoxin complexes mediate signaling through the lymphotoxin-beta receptor, influencing immune cell differentiation and tissue organization.

== Clinical significance ==
The membrane-bound form of lymphotoxin has been implicated in tumorigenesis. Mice engineered to overexpress LTα or LTβ exhibit increased tumor growth and metastasis in several cancer models. However, earlier studies were limited by the use of mice lacking the entire LTα gene, making it difficult to distinguish the effects of soluble versus membrane-associated lymphotoxins.

== Interactions ==
LTB has been shown to interact with Lymphotoxin alpha.
