= Leotiomycetes =

- Clockwise from top left: Calycina citrina (yellow fairy cups); Cystotheca lanestris; Capitotricha; Cyttaria espinosae (lihueñe); Chlorociboria aeruginascens (green wood cup); Rhytisma acerinum (black tar spot); Spathularia rufa; and Leotia viscosa (chicken lips)

Scientific classification
- Kingdom: Fungi
- Division: Ascomycota
- (unranked): Sordariomyceta
- Class: Leotiomycetes; Eriksson & Winka (1997)

Orders
- Cyttariales; Helotiales; Lahmiales; Lauriomycetales; Leotiales; Marthamycetales; Medeolariales; Micraspidales; Phacidiales; Rhytismatales; Thelebolales Families incertae sedis Thelocarpaceae Vezdaeaceae Genera incertae sedis Amylocarpus Catinella Chaetomella Cyclaneusma Discohainesia Eleutheromyces Geniculospora Hainesia Hyphozyma Leohumicola Meliniomyces Naemacyclus

Class of fungi

The Leotiomycetes are a class of ascomycete fungi. Some members of the class are known as plant pathogens.

== Systematics ==
The class Leotiomycetes contains numerous species with an anamorph placed within the fungi imperfecti (deuteromycota), that have only recently found their place in the phylogenetic system. The older classifications placed Leotiomycetes into the Discomycetes clade (inoperculate Discomycetes). Molecular studies have recently shed some new light to the still obscure systematics. Most scholars consider Leotiomycetes a sister taxon to Sordariomycetes in the phylogenetic tree of Pezizomycotina. Its division into subclasses have received strong support by the molecular data, but the overall monophyly of Leotiomycetes is dubious.

The order Lichinodiales and family Lichinodiaceae, newly circumscribed in 2019 to contain the cyanolichen genus Lichinodium, is the first known group of lichen-forming fungi in the Leotiomycetes. Family Lichinodiaceae was then placed in 2020 in the Leotiales order.

More orders were added in 2020, Lahmiales, Lauriomycetales, Marthamycetales, Medeolariales, Micraspidales and Phacidiales.

== Characteristics ==
- Most Leotiomycetes grow their asci in apothecia (seldom cleistothecia). The asci are cylindrical, without operculum.
- The spores are hyaline, of various shapes, and are released through a circular apical pore.
