= Lymphotoxin beta receptor =

LTBR
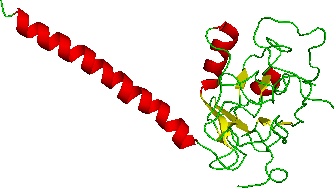

Identifiers
- Aliases: LTBR, CD18, D12S370, LT-BETA-R, TNF-R-III, TNFCR, TNFR-RP, TNFR2-RP, TNFR3, TNFRSF3, lymphotoxin beta receptor
- External IDs: OMIM: 600979; MGI: 104875; GeneCards: LTBR
Available structures
PDB	Ortholog search: PDBe RCSB
PDB	List of PDB id codes 1RF3, 4MXW

Gene location (Human)
Chr.	Chromosome 12 (human)
Band	12p13.31	Start	6,375,045 bp
Band	12p13.31	End	6,391,571 bp

Gene location (Mouse)
Chr.	Chromosome 6 (mouse)
Band	6 F3|6 59.32 cM	Start	125,283,534 bp
Band	6 F3|6 59.32 cM	End	125,290,848 bp
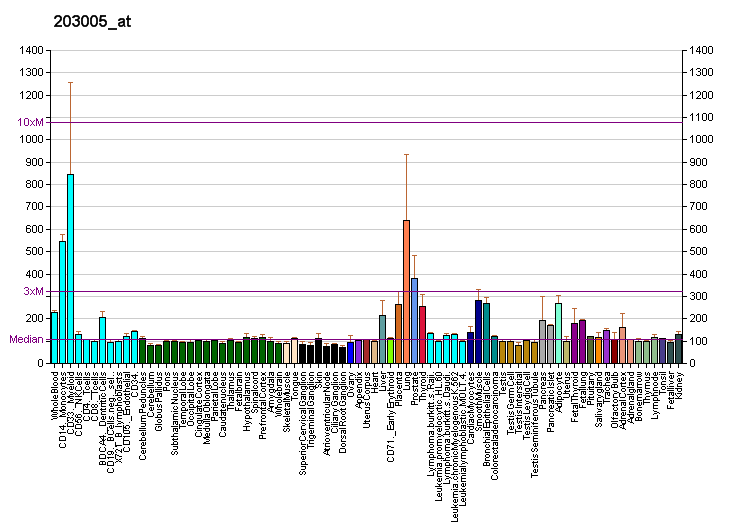
RNA expression pattern
Bgee	Human / Mouse (ortholog); Top expressed in: right lobe of thyroid gland; left lobe of thyroid gland; minor salivary glands; body of pancreas; body of stomach; upper lobe of left lung; muscle layer of sigmoid colon; right lobe of liver; left uterine tube; skin of abdomen / Top expressed in: granulocyte; duodenum; gastric mucosa; epithelium of stomach; yolk sac; mucous cell of stomach; right kidney; saccule; membranous bone; left lobe of liver; More reference expression data
BioGPS	More reference expression data
Gene ontology
Molecular function	protein binding; tumor necrosis factor-activated receptor activity; identical protein binding; ubiquitin protein ligase binding
Cellular component	integral component of membrane; membrane; plasma membrane; integral component of plasma membrane; Golgi apparatus
Biological process	myeloid dendritic cell differentiation; tumor necrosis factor-mediated signaling pathway; positive regulation of JNK cascade; multicellular organism development; cellular response to mechanical stimulus; response to lipopolysaccharide; regulation of cell population proliferation; positive regulation of extrinsic apoptotic signaling pathway; inflammatory response; viral process; signal transduction; apoptotic process; immune response; positive regulation of I-kappaB kinase/NF-kappaB signaling; hematopoietic or lymphoid organ development
Sources:Amigo / QuickGO
Orthologs
Databases	NCBI: entry; OMA: entry
Species	Human	Mouse
Entrez	4055	17000
Ensembl	ENSG00000111321	ENSMUSG00000030339
UniProt	P36941	P50284
RefSeq (mRNA)	NM_001270987; NM_002342	NM_010736
RefSeq (protein)	NP_001257916; NP_002333	NP_034866
Location (UCSC)	Chr 12: 6.38 – 6.39 Mb	Chr 6: 125.28 – 125.29 Mb
PubMed search
- Wikidata
View/Edit Human	View/Edit Mouse

Lymphotoxin beta receptor (LTBR), also known as tumor necrosis factor receptor superfamily member 3 (TNFRSF3), is a cell surface receptor for lymphotoxin involved in apoptosis and cytokine release. It is a member of the tumor necrosis factor receptor superfamily.

== Function ==
The protein encoded by this gene is a member of the tumor necrosis factor (TNF) family of receptors. It is expressed on the surface of most cell types, including cells of epithelial and myeloid lineages, but not on T and B lymphocytes. The protein specifically binds the lymphotoxin membrane form (a complex of lymphotoxin-alpha and lymphotoxin-beta). The encoded protein and its ligand play a role in the development and organization of lymphoid tissue and transformed cells. Activation of the encoded protein can trigger apoptosis.

Not only does the LTBR help trigger apoptosis, it can lead to the release of the cytokine interleukin 8. Overexpression of LTBR in HEK293 cells increases IL-8 promoter activity and leads to IL-8 release. LTBR is also essential for development and organization of the secondary lymphoid organs and chemokine release.

== Structure ==
The Ramachandran plots show that 64.6% of all residues were in a favored region. This structure was found using X-ray diffraction. The resolution is 3.50 angstroms. The alpha and beta angles are 90 degrees while the gamma angle is 120 degrees.

== Interactions ==
Lymphotoxin beta receptor has been shown to interact with Diablo homolog and TRAF3.
