= HLA-B8 =

Human leukocyte antigen serotype

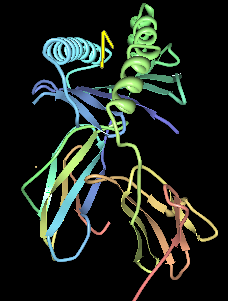
B*0801-β2MG with bound peptide1m05
major histocompatibility complex (human), class I, B8
Alleles	B*0801
Structure (See HLA-B)		Avail. 3D structures
EBI-HLA	B*0801	1mi5, 1m05 1agf, 1age 1agd, 1agc 1agb,1a9b
Symbol(s)	HLA-B
Locus	chr.6 6p21.31

HLA-B8 (B8) is an HLA-B serotype. The serotype identifies the HLA-B*08 gene products. (For terminology help see: HLA-serotype tutorial) HLA-B8, previously known as HL-A8 was one of the first identified of the HLA antigens. It coined the "Super B8" haplotype, also called the ancestral European haplotype because of its common occurrence in Europe, particular the isles and Scandinavia. B8 is a component gene-allele of the AH8.1 haplotype in Northern and Western Europeans. Genes between B8 and DR3 on this haplotype are frequently associated with autoimmune disease.

== Serotype ==
B8 serotype recognition of Some HLA B*08 allele-group gene products
B*08	B8	Sample
allele	%	size (N)
*8101	99	6508
*0804	29	7
Allele links out to IMGT/HLA Databease at EBI

== Alleles ==
HLA B*0801 frequencies
		freq
ref.	Population	(%)
	Ireland South	18.2
	Australia New South Wales	17.3
	Ireland Northern	16.2
	Belgium	12.6
	Oman	11.0
	Spain Basque Gipuzkoa Province	9.1
	Finland	8.9
	France South East	8.9
	Scotland Orkney	8.8
	Morocco Nador Metalsa Class I	8.7
	India New Delhi	8.3
	Spain Eastern Andalusia Gipsy	8.1
	Madeira	7.8
	Guinea Bissau	7.7
	Iran Baloch	7.6
	South African Natal Zulu	7.5
	Brazil Belo Horizonte	7.4
	Cape Verde Southeastern Islands	7.3
	Romanian	7.3
	Saudi Arabia Guraiat and Hail	7.1
	South Africa Natal Tamil	7.1
	Georgia Svaneti Svans	6.9
	India Andhra Pradesh Golla	6.7
	Portugal North	6.5
	Azores Santa Maria and Sao Miguel	6.4
	Uganda Kampala	6.2
	Cape Verde Northwestern Islands	5.6
	Cameroon Yaounde	5.4
	Italy Bergamo	5.3
	Czech Republic	5.2
	Cameroon Pygmy Baka	5.0
	Senegal Niokholo Mandenka	4.8
	Kenya Nandi	4.6
	Spain Catalonia Girona	4.6
	Tunisia	4.6
	Bulgaria Gipsy	4.5
	Tunisia Tunis	4.5
	Brazil	4.3
	Portugal Centre	4.0
	Sudanese	4.0
	Cameroon Sawa	3.8
	Jordan Amman	3.8
	Indig. Australian, Cape York Peninsula	3.5
	Georgia Tbilisi Kurds	3.4
	Zambia Lusaka	3.4
	Kenya	3.1
	Zimbabwe Harare Shona	3.1
	Kenya Luo	3.0
	Mexico Zaptotec Oaxaca	3.0
	India North Hindus	2.9
	Mexico Mestizos	2.4
	Ivory Coast Akan Adiopodoume	2.3
	Indig. Australian, Groote Eylandt	2.0
	Portugal South	2.0
	Georgia Tbilisi Georgians	1.9
	Azores Central Islands	1.8
	Bulgaria	1.8
	Argentina Toba Rosario	1.7
	Croatia	1.7
	India North Delhi	1.6
	China North Han	1.4
	Cameroon Beti	1.1
	Cameroon Bakola Pygmy	1.0
	India West Coast Parsis	1.0
	Taiwan Siraya	1.0
