= Activation-induced cell death =

Type of programmed cell death

AICD (activation-induced cell death) is programmed cell death caused by the interaction of Fas receptors (Fas, CD95) and Fas ligands (FasL, CD95 ligand). AICD is a negative regulator of activated T lymphocytes that results from repeated stimulation of their T-cell receptors (TCR) and helps to maintain peripheral immune tolerance. Alteration of the process may lead to autoimmune diseases. In fact AICD in T cells might be one of the mechanisms of resistance to cancer immunotherapy.

The AICD effector cell is one that expresses FasL, and apoptosis is induced in the cell expressing the Fas receptor. Both activated T cells and B cells express Fas and undergo clonal deletion by the AICD mechanism. Activated T cells that express both Fas and FasL may be killed by themselves or by each other.

== Signaling ==
The binding of Fas ligand to Fas receptor triggers trimerization of Fas, whose cytoplasmic domain is then able to bind the death domain of the adaptor protein FADD (Fas-associated protein with death domain). Procaspase 8 binds to FADD's death effector domain (DED) and proteolytically self-activates as caspase 8. Fas, FADD, and procaspase 8 together form a death-inducing signaling complex (DISC). Activated caspase 8 is released into the cytosol, where it activates the caspase cascade that initiates apoptosis.

== Regulation of Fas-FasL and AICD ==
FasL is primarily regulated at the transcriptional level. (The other option is regulation of the signal emanating from the death receptor itself, controlling sensitivity to the induction of apoptosis.) NFAT activated by TCR stimulation activates FasL transcription, possibly indirectly by upregulating early growth response proteins. T cell activation-induced transcription of FasL is further regulated by c-Myc–MAX heterodimers, and can be blocked by c-Myc downregulation. Interferon regulatory factors IRF1 and IRF2 also upregulate FasL transcription by directly binding to the FasL promoter.

Not much is known about the regulation of Fas and other death receptors. However, overexpression of the protein CFLAR (caspase and FADD-like apoptosis regulator) inhibits Fas-mediated apoptosis.

== See also ==
- Immune system
- Autoimmunity
