= Death fold =

Tertiary protein structure motif

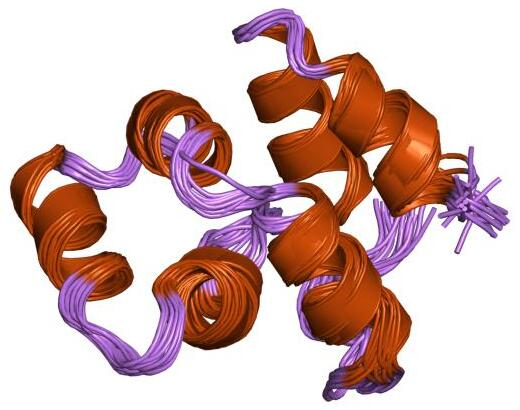
Structure of a death domain protein. 1ngr

The death fold is a tertiary structure motif commonly found in proteins involved in apoptosis or inflammation-related processes. This motif is commonly found in domains that participate in protein–protein interactions leading to the formation of large functional complexes. Examples of death fold domains include the death domain (DD), death effector domain (DED), caspase recruitment domain (CARD), and pyrin domain (PYD).

Death fold domains are an evolutionarily conserved superfamily of domains that mediate apoptotic signaling. The two types of apoptosis, extrinsic and intrinsic, are tightly regulated by the interplay of activating and inhibitory pathways. The interactions between the four different death fold motifs are a unifying mechanism in both types of apoptosis.

== Structure ==
There is a large difference in the primary amino acid sequence of the four different death fold motifs, but each has a similar three-dimensional structure. Death-fold motifs are characterized by six to seven tightly coiled alpha-helices arranged in a "Greek-key" fold. The motifs permit specific interactions with proteins containing the correct homotypic death-fold domain.

== Types ==
=== Caspase recruitment domain (CARD) ===
CARD-containing proteins are found throughout the animal kingdom. CARD domains are present on several mammalian procaspases, and have functions in apoptosis, cytokine processing, immune defense, and NF-κB activation. In insects and nematodes, CARDs so far seem restricted to apoptotic proteins.

=== Death domain (DD) ===
DDs are found primarily in vertebrates (although they are also present in some other animals). DDs are contained on cytokine receptors in the TNF receptor family. DD proteins function in apoptosis and NF-κB signaling in mammals, but only NF-κB signaling Drosophila.

=== Death effector domain (DED) ===
DEDs are present on caspases and are involved in caspase activation. DED-containing caspases function in death receptor-induced apoptosis in mammals, but differ in insects where they are involved in NF-κB signaling and antibacterial responses.

=== PYRIN ===
PYRINS are the most recently discovered death-fold domain, and their functions and interactions have yet to be clearly elucidated.

== Binding and interactions ==
Death-fold motifs are believed to exert their effects solely through monovalent, homotypic interactions. In these interactions death-folds bind to another death-fold containing domain through the same type of protein interaction domain. These interactions are highly specific, and there are no known interactions between different types of death-fold domains – in every known case the binding partners have homologous domain (DD-DD, CARD-CARD, DED-DED). The role of these homotypic interactions is thought to be self-assembly. This results in large multi-subunit structures made of only one type of protein.
