= Mir-601 microRNA precursor family =

MicroRNA molecule

mir-601

Identifiers
- Symbol: mir-601
- Rfam: RF01006
- miRBase family: MIPF0000522

Other data
- RNA type: microRNA
- Domain(s): Eukaryota;
- PDB structures: PDBe

In molecular biology mir-601 microRNA is a short RNA molecule. MicroRNAs function to regulate the expression levels of other genes by several mechanisms.

== Molecular pathway regulation ==
miR-601 has been found to affect a number of different cell signalling pathways, more specifically bringing about downregulation of Fas-induced apoptosis and NF-kappa B signalling. There is additionally upregulation of the actin cytoskeleton and increased negative regulation of translational initiation by miR-601. The importance of NF-kappa B in tumour cell proliferation and enhanced survival means that miR-601 mimics may hold a lot of promise for prevention or treatment of carcinogenesis.

miR-602 has further been linked to the development and progression of gastric cancer, with levels significantly upregulated compared with normal gastric tissue.

== See also ==
- MicroRNA
