= Death Domain database =

Secondary database of protein-protein interactions (PPI)

Death Domain Database
Content
- Description: protein-protein interaction database for the Death Domain superfamily.

Contact
- Authors: Dongseop Kwon
- Primary citation: PMID 22135292
- Release date: 2011

Access
- Website: www.deathdomain.org

The Death Domain database is a secondary database of protein-protein interactions (PPI) of the death domain superfamily. Members of this superfamily are key players in apoptosis, inflammation, necrosis, and immune cell signaling pathways. Negative death domain superfamily-mediated signaling events result in various human diseases which include, cancers, neurodegenerative diseases, and immunological disorders. Creating death domain databases are of particular interest to researchers in the biomedical field as it enables a further understanding of the molecular mechanisms involved in death domain interactions while also providing easy access to tools such as an interaction map that illustrates the protein-protein interaction network and information. There is currently only one database that exclusively looks at death domains but there are other databases and resources that have information on this superfamily. According to PubMed, this database has been cited by seven peer-reviewed articles to date because of its extensive and specific information on the death domains and their PPI summaries.

== The Death Domain superfamily ==
The evolutionarily conserved Death Domain superfamily is defined by a death fold motif which is formed by several protein-interaction domains. The domains consist of six-seven tightly coiled alpha-helices arranged in a "Greek-key fold". This superfamily is considered one of the largest and most studied protein-protein interaction (PPI) network.

There are four types of death domain subfamilies: death effector domain (DED), caspase recruitment domain (CARD), pyrin domain (PYD), and death domain (DD). These subfamily domains are grouped together because of similarity in their sequence and structure. However, while similar, each domain has its own defining structural feature: a RxDL-motif in the DEDs, an interrupted, first helix in the CARDs, a smaller (or sometimes ambiguous) third helix in PYDs, and a more exposed, flexible third helix in the DDs. Members of this subfamily only form homotypic bonds with the same type of subfamily domain. For example, DED will only bind with DED, CARD-CARD, PYD-PYD and DD-DD. These homotypic interactions are with only two members of the same domain (or on rare occasions with more) and there has been no evidence to suggest that these domains have heterotypic interactions with one another.

=== Death Domain subfamilies ===
==== Death effector domain (DED) ====
DED domains are highly conserved in the Chordata phylum and can also be found in smaller percentages in the Echinodermata phylum and viruses. DED-containing proteins are associated with apoptosis regulation with caspase protein interaction and have been notably documented in mammals. DED domains have been known to interact with other domains and include: nuclear localization sequences (in DEDD), transmembrane domains (in Bap31 and Bar), nucleotide-binding domains (in Dap3), SAM domains (in Bar), coiled-coil domains (in Hip and Hippi), and E2-binding RING domains (in Bar).

==== Caspase recruitment domain (CARD) ====
CARD domains are primarily found in chordates, with many being from the animal kingdom, and are found in smaller percentages in Nematoda and Echinodermata phyla. Protein modules containing the CARD domain are associated with apoptosis, through the regulation of caspases that they are interacting with, as well in inflammation processes through its participation in NF-kappaB signaling pathways.

==== Pyrin domain (PYD) ====
The PYD domain, also known as the Domain in Apoptosis and INterferon response (DAPIN) domain, is typically found in vertebrates and viral proteins and are involved in apoptosis, cancer, and inflammation. The functions of this group are the least understood among the 4 members of the death domain superfamily.

==== Death domain (DD) ====
This domain is predominantly found in the animal kingdom, especially among mammals, who have many different types of PPI's containing death domains. According to SMART's non-redundant database, mammals have about 61% of known DD-domains. DD-containing proteins are associated with apoptosis and inflammation, similar to the CARD domain. It has also been linked with innate immunity. DDs can also be found with other types of domains including Ankyrin repeats, caspase-like folds, kinase domains, leucine zippers, leucine-rich repeats (LRR), TIR domains, and ZU5 domains.

== Overview ==
Deathdomain.org was initially created by Kwon et al. (2012) to stimulate further research into the death domain superfamily mediated signaling pathway. Their database is manually curated and focuses on providing detailed information on the death domain superfamily and its protein-protein interactions. Kwon and his team started by researching, compiling and curating 295 published peer-reviewed studies that focused on PPI modules and their associated death domains. The database now provides users with information from 311 peer-reviewed studies, a slight increase from the original publication.

This database provides:

- Comprehensive summaries of the death domain superfamily proteins and associated PPI data
- Information on relevant analytical methods from the literature, domain structure, and experimental resources
- Features and tools to facilitate learning and research on the signaling network mediated by the death domain superfamily (search engine, an interaction map, and links to compare information to other databases)

=== Constructing the database ===
PubMed database was the primary source used for data collection in the DeathDomain.org database. The authors for the site started by finding synonyms for the 99 death domain superfamily proteins from UniProtKB and Entrez Gene. Along with the protein name, synonyms were used to search for articles in the PudMed database for death domain proteins that were involved in physical binding to other proteins. Further searches were done on DIP, IntAct, MINT and STRING databases to ensure that all relevant articles were included in the study. The authors were able to find and manually curate 295 peer-reviewed articles that discussed 175 PPI pairs among 99 DD superfamily proteins. These numbers have increased since the original publication to 311 peer-reviewed papers discussing 181 PPI pairs among 99 DD superfamily proteins.

To curate data in the literature, the authors chose to focus on the analytical methods, experimental results, resources, and nomenclature. If there was insufficient data in the papers, users will see "Not specified" in these sections.

=== Features ===
==== DD superfamily and PPI summaries ====
This feature can be accessed by picking a death domain of interest and using the subtab to pick a protein containing this domain. It will take the user to a wealth of information that can be seen in great detail ("In detail" tab) or in lesser detail ("At a glance" tab) on top (Fig. 1D and 1C, respectively). The data is further broken down into three categories: interaction, characterization, and functional role. These categories were chosen because they were used in similar studies. In most cases, for each PPI, users can learn more about them by clicking the PubMed ID, giving details including the title, abstract, authors, interactions mentioned in the article, and a link to the publication.

Other subheading tabs give access to protein information including the proteins full name, alternative names, function, and death domain subfamily and boundary region. The latter conveniently allows users to obtain the amino acid sequences and domain boundaries from UniProtKB/Swiss-Prot and UniProtKB/TrEMBL databases in either embl, genbank or fasta format. By clicking the external database link, users can get this information for the domain-containing protein found in other species. They can also access more information on similar databases (Uniprot, DIP, STRING, KEGG, IntAct, and MINT) by clicking the appropriate identifier number. The last two tabs will provide users with downloadable 3-D structure images under the "3-D structure" tab and the natural mutations and related diseases they are involved in under the "Disease" tab (Fig. 1E).

==== Statistics ====
The statistics page consists of a list of publications (separated by year of publication) used in the database and can be accessed via a hyperlink. The page also presents tabulated summaries of the number of PPIs per domain and are also hyperlinked to their PPI summary page. Another tabulated feature is a comparison of the DD superfamily mediated PPI pairs found on the Death Domain database to other PPI databases. This page illustrates to users that their database has more PPI pairs than Deathbase.org and the same number as IntAct and Mint.

== Other resources ==
Database Name	Type of Database	Features	Organisms in Database
Deathbase	Database of proteins involved in cell death	-Data on function, structure, and evolution of proteins involved in apoptosis/ other forms of cell death -Manually curated data -Easy searches based on species, protein, pathway, family, and domain names	Human Mouse Zebrafish Fly Worm
IntAct	Molecular interaction database	-Open source database system and includes analysis tools for molecular interaction data -Manually curated data (from EMBL-EBI) -Comprehensive search options: Gene, Protein, RNA, Chemical name, UniProtKB, ChEBI AC, UniProtKB ID, RNACentral ID, PMID, and IMEx ID	Cellular organisms Viruses Many others
MINT	Molecular interaction database	-Experimentally verified protein-protein interaction data -Manually curated data -Easy search options: species, protein, gene name, UniProt Protein Accession Number, and PubMed id/D.O.I	Human Yeast Fruit Fly Worm
STRING	Protein-protein interaction network database	-Data on known and predicted protein-protein interactions: direct (physical) and indirect (functional) association -Manually curated data -Easy search options: Species, protein name, and Identifier	2031 total organisms
DIP	Protein-protein interaction network database	-Data on experimentally determined interactions between proteins -Manually curated data -Easy search options: protein, sequence, motif, article, IMEx, and pathBLAST	Human Yeast Fruit Fly Many others
