= Extrinsic pathway =

In molecular biology, the term extrinsic pathway may refer to multiple cascades of protein interactions.

- The extrinsic pathway of apoptosis refers to cell death induced by external factors that activate the death-inducing signaling complex.
- The extrinsic pathway of blood coagulation is also known as the tissue factor pathway and refers to a cascade of enzymatic reactions resulting in blood clotting and is done with the addition of injured tissue cells.
