= PACSIN1 =

Protein-coding gene in the species Homo sapiens

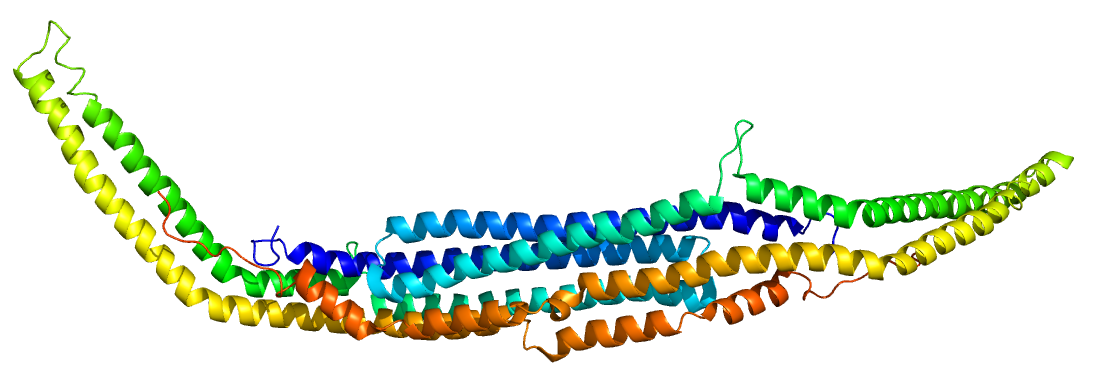

Identifiers
- Aliases: PACSIN1, SDPI, protein kinase C and casein kinase substrate in neurons 1
- External IDs: OMIM: 606512; MGI: 1345181; GeneCards: PACSIN1
Available structures
PDB	Ortholog search: PDBe RCSB
PDB	List of PDB id codes 3HAH, 3HAI, 3Q84, 3QNI

Gene location (Human)
Chr.	Chromosome 6 (human)
Band	6p21.31	Start	34,466,061 bp
Band	6p21.31	End	34,535,229 bp

Gene location (Mouse)
Chr.	Chromosome 17 (mouse)
Band	17|17 A3.3	Start	27,874,483 bp
Band	17|17 A3.3	End	27,930,456 bp
RNA expression pattern
Bgee	Human / Mouse (ortholog); Top expressed in: right frontal lobe; superior frontal gyrus; postcentral gyrus; entorhinal cortex; middle temporal gyrus; primary visual cortex; dorsolateral prefrontal cortex; anterior cingulate cortex; right hemisphere of cerebellum; prefrontal cortex / Top expressed in: pontine nuclei; piriform cortex; superior frontal gyrus; primary visual cortex; subiculum; dorsal tegmental nucleus; cerebellar cortex; neural layer of retina; primary motor cortex; prefrontal cortex; More reference expression data
BioGPS	n/a
Gene ontology
Molecular function	cytoskeletal protein binding; protein binding; phospholipid binding; lipid binding; identical protein binding
Cellular component	cytoplasm; axon terminus; cytosol; endosome; cell projection; membrane; myelin sheath; plasma membrane; synapse; ruffle membrane; cell junction; perinuclear region of cytoplasm; neuron projection; cytoplasmic vesicle membrane; cytoplasmic vesicle; COPI-coated vesicle; cytoskeleton; photoreceptor ribbon synapse; presynaptic endocytic zone
Biological process	regulation of endocytosis; negative regulation of endocytosis; protein localization to membrane; neuron projection morphogenesis; endocytosis; actin filament organization; neuron development; positive regulation of dendrite development; plasma membrane tubulation; synaptic vesicle endocytosis; protein localization to plasma membrane; cytoskeleton organization
Sources:Amigo / QuickGO
Orthologs
Databases	NCBI: entry; OMA: entry
Species	Human	Mouse
Entrez	29993	23969
Ensembl	ENSG00000124507	ENSMUSG00000040276
UniProt	Q9BY11	Q61644
RefSeq (mRNA)	NM_001199583; NM_020804	NM_001286743; NM_001286744; NM_011861; NM_178365
RefSeq (protein)	NP_001186512; NP_065855	NP_001273672; NP_001273673; NP_035991; NP_848142
Location (UCSC)	Chr 6: 34.47 – 34.54 Mb	Chr 17: 27.87 – 27.93 Mb
PubMed search
- Wikidata
View/Edit Human	View/Edit Mouse

Protein kinase C and casein kinase substrate in neurons protein 1 also known as syndapin I is an enzyme that in humans is encoded by the PACSIN1 gene.

== Interactions ==
PACSIN1 has been shown to interact with GTPases of the Dynamin family (Dynamin 1, 2 and 3). Based on this interaction, its localization and functional role the protein was named syndapin I (synaptic dynamin-associated protein I).

A variety of interactions have been published:

- DNM1
- Huntingtin
- PACSIN2
- PACSIN3
