= Herpesvirus entry mediator =

Protein found in humans

TNFRSF14
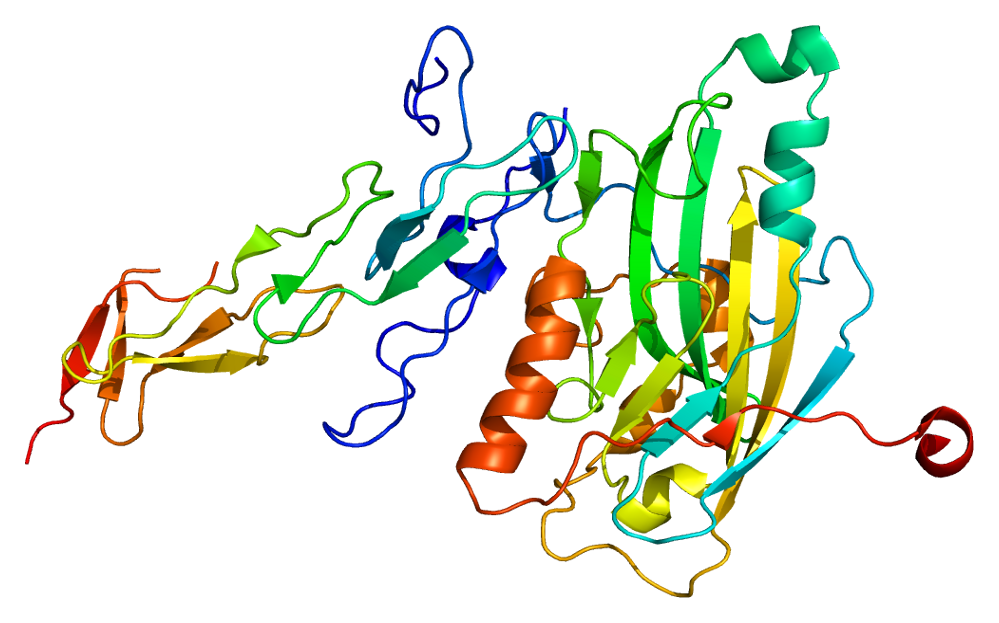

Identifiers
- Aliases: TNFRSF14, ATAR, CD270, HVEA, HVEM, LIGHTR, TR2, tumor necrosis factor receptor superfamily member 14, TNF receptor superfamily member 14
- External IDs: OMIM: 602746; MGI: 2675303; GeneCards: TNFRSF14
Available structures
PDB	Ortholog search: PDBe RCSB
PDB	List of PDB id codes 1JMA, 2AW2, 4FHQ, 4RSU

Gene location (Human)
Chr.	Chromosome 1 (human)
Band	1p36.32	Start	2,555,639 bp
Band	1p36.32	End	2,565,382 bp

Gene location (Mouse)
Chr.	Chromosome 4 (mouse)
Band	4|4 E2	Start	155,006,390 bp
Band	4|4 E2	End	155,013,020 bp
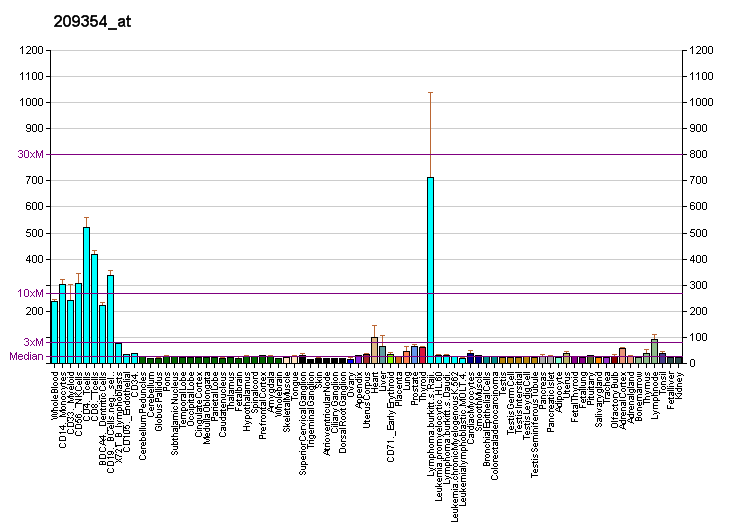
RNA expression pattern
Bgee	Human / Mouse (ortholog); Top expressed in: granulocyte; spleen; right uterine tube; duodenum; transverse colon; mucosa of transverse colon; right adrenal cortex; canal of the cervix; blood; gastric mucosa / Top expressed in: granulocyte; thymus; yolk sac; embryo; muscle of thigh; duodenum; lip; spleen; jejunum; blood; More reference expression data
BioGPS	More reference expression data
Gene ontology
Molecular function	virus receptor activity; protein binding; tumor necrosis factor-activated receptor activity; ubiquitin protein ligase binding; cytokine binding
Cellular component	integral component of membrane; membrane; plasma membrane; integral component of plasma membrane; external side of plasma membrane
Biological process	regulation of apoptotic process; T cell costimulation; tumor necrosis factor-mediated signaling pathway; multicellular organism development; cell surface receptor signaling pathway; response to lipopolysaccharide; regulation of cell population proliferation; immune response; apoptotic signaling pathway; viral entry into host cell; inflammatory response; viral process; negative regulation of alpha-beta T cell proliferation; positive regulation of peptidyl-tyrosine phosphorylation; defense response to Gram-negative bacterium; defense response to Gram-positive bacterium; positive regulation of T cell migration
Sources:Amigo / QuickGO
Orthologs
Databases	NCBI: entry; OMA: entry
Species	Human	Mouse
Entrez	8764	230979
Ensembl	ENSG00000273936; ENSG00000157873	ENSMUSG00000042333
UniProt	Q92956	Q80WM9
RefSeq (mRNA)	NM_001297605; NM_003820	NM_178931
RefSeq (protein)	NP_001284534; NP_003811	NP_849262
Location (UCSC)	Chr 1: 2.56 – 2.57 Mb	Chr 4: 155.01 – 155.01 Mb
PubMed search
- Wikidata
View/Edit Human	View/Edit Mouse

Herpesvirus entry mediator (HVEM), also known as tumor necrosis factor receptor superfamily member 14 (TNFRSF14), is a human cell surface receptor of the TNF-receptor superfamily encoded by the TNFRSF14 gene.

== Nomenclature ==
This protein was originally known as herpesvirus entry mediator A (HveA); HveB and HveC are structurally unrelated proteins of the immunoglobulin superfamily. It is also known as CD270 in the cluster of differentiation classification. Moreover, it is also referred to as ATAR (another TRAF-associated receptor).

== Function ==
The protein encoded by this gene is a member of the TNF-receptor superfamily. The cytoplasmic region of this receptor was found to bind to several TNF receptor associated factor (TRAF) family members, which may mediate the signal transduction pathways that activate the immune response.

In melanocytic cells TNFRSF14 gene expression may be regulated by MITF.

== Interactions ==
TNFRSF14 has been shown to interact with TRAF2, TNFSF14 and TRAF5.

== Clinical relevance ==
Mutations in this gene have been recurrently been associated to cases of diffuse large B-cell lymphoma and pediatric-type follicular lymphoma.

This receptor was identified as a cellular mediator of herpes simplex virus (HSV) entry. Binding of HSV viral envelope glycoprotein D (gD) to this receptor protein has been shown to be part of the viral entry mechanism.
