= FAF1 =

Protein-coding gene in humans

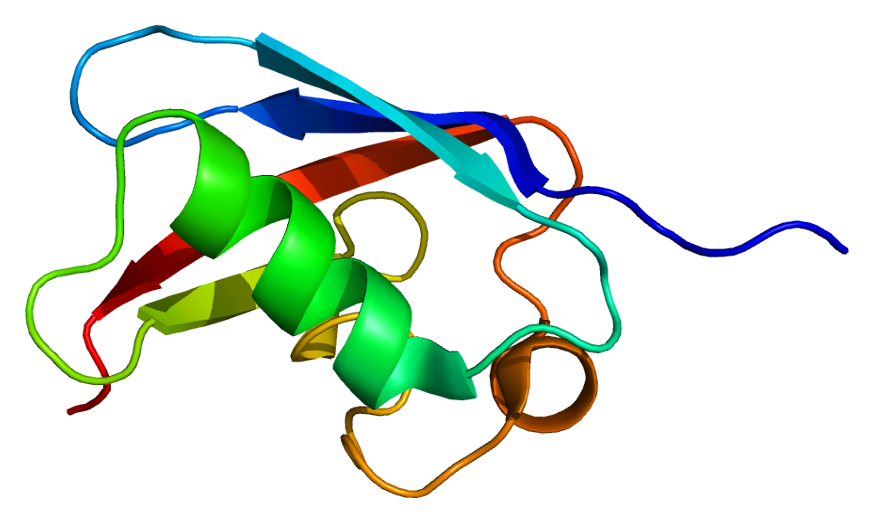

Identifiers
- Aliases: FAF1, HFAF1s, UBXD12, UBXN3A, hCGI-03, Fas associated factor 1
- External IDs: OMIM: 604460; MGI: 109419; GeneCards: FAF1
Available structures
| PDB | Ortholog search: PDBe RCSB |
| PDB | List of PDB id codes 1H8C, 2DZM, 2EC4, 3E21, 3QC8, 3QCA, 3QQ8, 3QWZ, 3QX1, 3R3M |

Gene location (Human)
| Chr. | Chromosome 1 (human) |
| Band | 1p32.3 | Start | 50,437,028 bp |
| Band | 1p32.3 | End | 50,960,267 bp |

Gene location (Mouse)
| Chr. | Chromosome 4 (mouse) |
| Band | 4 C7|4 51.33 cM | Start | 109,533,785 bp |
| Band | 4 C7|4 51.33 cM | End | 109,821,157 bp |
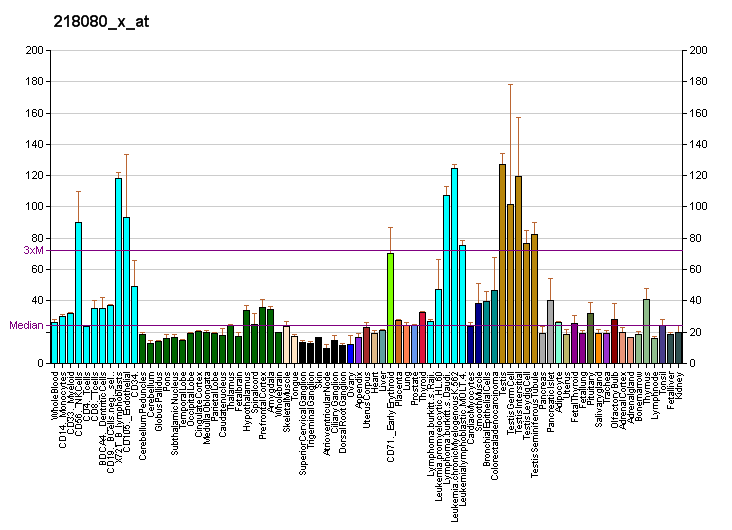
RNA expression pattern
| Bgee | Human / Mouse (ortholog); Top expressed in: gastrocnemius muscle; left testis; right testis; muscle of thigh; ganglionic eminence; glutes; triceps brachii muscle; ventricular zone; Skeletal muscle tissue of rectus abdominis; body of pancreas / Top expressed in: Paneth cell; internal carotid artery; facial motor nucleus; external carotid artery; digastric muscle; spermatocyte; triceps brachii muscle; epithelium of lens; temporal muscle; sternocleidomastoid muscle; More reference expression data |
| BioGPS | More reference expression data |
Gene ontology
| Molecular function | heat shock protein binding; protein domain specific binding; NF-kappaB binding; ubiquitin binding; protein binding; protein kinase regulator activity; protein kinase binding; ubiquitin protein ligase binding |
| Cellular component | cytoplasm; cytosol; CD95 death-inducing signaling complex; nuclear envelope; VCP-NPL4-UFD1 AAA ATPase complex; perinuclear region of cytoplasm; nucleus |
| Biological process | positive regulation of extrinsic apoptotic signaling pathway via death domain receptors; positive regulation of cell death; positive regulation of protein-containing complex assembly; cytoplasmic sequestering of NF-kappaB; regulation of cell adhesion; regulation of protein catabolic process; positive regulation of apoptotic process; apoptotic process; regulation of protein kinase activity; proteasome-mediated ubiquitin-dependent protein catabolic process; cell death; positive regulation of DNA replication |
Sources:Amigo / QuickGO
Orthologs
| Databases | NCBI: entry; OMA: entry |
| Species | Human | Mouse |
| Entrez | 11124 | 14084 |
| Ensembl | ENSG00000185104 | ENSMUSG00000010517 |
| UniProt | Q9UNN5 | P54731 |
| RefSeq (mRNA) | NM_131917; NM_007051 | NM_007983 |
| RefSeq (protein) | NP_008982 | NP_032009 |
| Location (UCSC) | Chr 1: 50.44 – 50.96 Mb | Chr 4: 109.53 – 109.82 Mb |
| PubMed search |
- Wikidata
| View/Edit Human | View/Edit Mouse |

FAS-associated factor 1 is a protein that in humans is encoded by the FAF1 gene.

Interaction of Fas ligand (TNFSF6) with the FAS antigen (TNFRSF6) mediates programmed cell death, also called apoptosis, in a number of organ systems. The protein encoded by this gene binds to FAS antigen and can initiate apoptosis or enhance apoptosis initiated through FAS antigen. Initiation of apoptosis by the protein encoded by this gene requires a ubiquitin-like domain but not the FAS-binding domain.
