= PACSIN3 =

Protein-coding gene in the species Homo sapiens

Identifiers
- Aliases: PACSIN3, SDPIII, protein kinase C and casein kinase substrate in neurons 3
- External IDs: OMIM: 606513; MGI: 1891410; GeneCards: PACSIN3

Gene location (Human)
Chr.	Chromosome 11 (human)
Band	11p11.2	Start	47,177,522 bp
Band	11p11.2	End	47,186,443 bp

Gene location (Mouse)
Chr.	Chromosome 2 (mouse)
Band	2|2 E1	Start	91,086,299 bp
Band	2|2 E1	End	91,095,024 bp
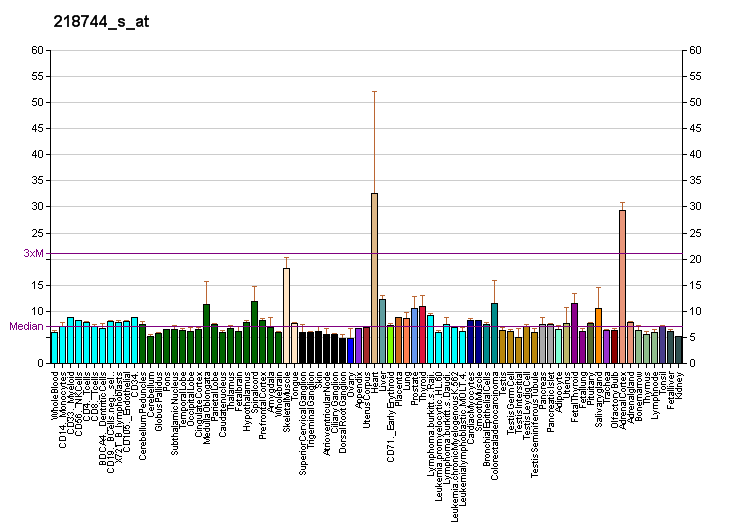
RNA expression pattern
Bgee	Human / Mouse (ortholog); Top expressed in: apex of heart; muscle of thigh; gastrocnemius muscle; body of tongue; Skeletal muscle tissue of rectus abdominis; left ventricle; right auricle of heart; right adrenal cortex; left adrenal gland; left adrenal cortex / Top expressed in: muscle of thigh; interventricular septum; temporal muscle; skeletal muscle tissue; digastric muscle; sternocleidomastoid muscle; triceps brachii muscle; esophagus; soleus muscle; lip; More reference expression data
BioGPS	More reference expression data
Gene ontology
Molecular function	cytoskeletal protein binding; calcium channel inhibitor activity; protein binding; lipid binding; phospholipid binding
Cellular component	endosome; plasma membrane; extracellular exosome; membrane; cytoplasm; cytosol; cytoskeleton
Biological process	regulation of endocytosis; negative regulation of endocytosis; positive regulation of membrane protein ectodomain proteolysis; endocytosis; plasma membrane tubulation; negative regulation of calcium ion transport; regulation of molecular function; cytoskeleton organization
Sources:Amigo / QuickGO
Orthologs
Databases	NCBI: entry; OMA: entry
Species	Human	Mouse
Entrez	29763	80708
Ensembl	ENSG00000165912	ENSMUSG00000027257
UniProt	Q9UKS6	Q99JB8
RefSeq (mRNA)	NM_016223; NM_001184974; NM_001184975	NM_001289677; NM_001289678; NM_028733; NM_030880
RefSeq (protein)	NP_001171903; NP_001171904; NP_057307	NP_001276606; NP_001276607; NP_083009; NP_112019
Location (UCSC)	Chr 11: 47.18 – 47.19 Mb	Chr 2: 91.09 – 91.1 Mb
PubMed search
- Wikidata
View/Edit Human	View/Edit Mouse

Protein kinase C and casein kinase substrate in neurons protein 3 is an enzyme that in humans is encoded by the PACSIN3 gene.

Human disease

Biallelic truncating variants in the PACSIN3 gene has been associated with hyperCKemia and childhood onset myopathy.

== Interactions ==
PACSIN3 has been shown to interact with PACSIN1 and PACSIN2.
