= PACSIN2 =

Protein-coding gene in the species Homo sapiens

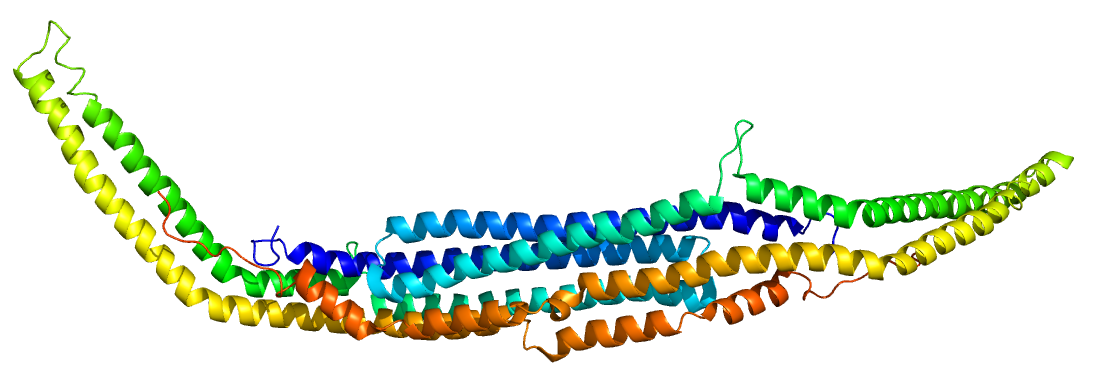

Identifiers
- Aliases: PACSIN2, SDPII, protein kinase C and casein kinase substrate in neurons 2
- External IDs: OMIM: 604960; MGI: 1345153; GeneCards: PACSIN2
Available structures
PDB	Ortholog search: PDBe RCSB
PDB	List of PDB id codes 3ABH, 3ACO, 3HAJ, 3Q0K

Gene location (Human)
Chr.	Chromosome 22 (human)
Band	22q13.2	Start	42,835,412 bp
Band	22q13.2	End	43,015,149 bp

Gene location (Mouse)
Chr.	Chromosome 15 (mouse)
Band	15|15 E1	Start	83,259,808 bp
Band	15|15 E1	End	83,348,807 bp
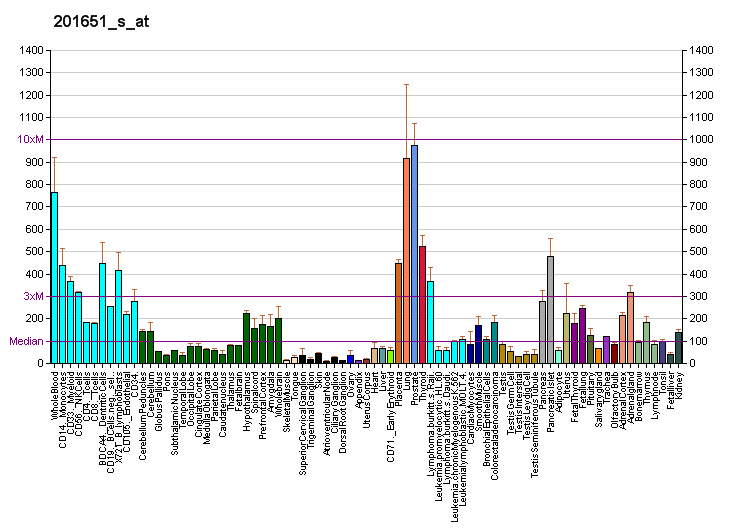
RNA expression pattern
Bgee	Human / Mouse (ortholog); Top expressed in: parotid gland; tibia; mucosa of sigmoid colon; visceral pleura; body of pancreas; cartilage tissue; endothelial cell; renal medulla; urethra; cardia / Top expressed in: interventricular septum; epithelium of stomach; neural layer of retina; primary oocyte; secondary oocyte; vestibular membrane of cochlear duct; myocardium of ventricle; zygote; atrioventricular valve; tunica media of zone of aorta; More reference expression data
BioGPS	More reference expression data
Gene ontology
Molecular function	transporter activity; cytoskeletal protein binding; phosphatidic acid binding; protein binding; identical protein binding; lipid binding; cadherin binding; phospholipid binding
Cellular component	endosome; cell projection; membrane; intracellular membrane-bounded organelle; cell-cell junction; focal adhesion; ruffle membrane; recycling endosome membrane; early endosome; caveola; extracellular exosome; cytoplasmic vesicle membrane; cytoskeleton; cytoplasmic vesicle; extrinsic component of membrane; cytoplasm; cytosol; plasma membrane; nuclear speck; glutamatergic synapse
Biological process	regulation of endocytosis; caveolin-mediated endocytosis; negative regulation of endocytosis; endocytosis; caveola assembly; plasma membrane tubulation; protein localization to endosome; cell projection morphogenesis; actin cytoskeleton organization; membrane organization; cytoskeleton organization; modulation of chemical synaptic transmission
Sources:Amigo / QuickGO
Orthologs
Databases	NCBI: entry; OMA: entry
Species	Human	Mouse
Entrez	11252	23970
Ensembl	ENSG00000100266	ENSMUSG00000016664
UniProt	Q9UNF0	Q9WVE8
RefSeq (mRNA)	NM_001184970; NM_001184971; NM_007229; NM_001349968; NM_001349969 NM_001349970; NM_001349971; NM_001349972; NM_001349973; NM_001349974	NM_001159509; NM_001159510; NM_011862; NM_001358641; NM_001358642 NM_001358643; NM_001358644
RefSeq (protein)	NP_001171899; NP_001171900; NP_009160; NP_001336897; NP_001336898 NP_001336899; NP_001336900; NP_001336901; NP_001336902; NP_001336903	NP_001152981; NP_001152982; NP_035992; NP_001345570; NP_001345571 NP_001345572; NP_001345573
Location (UCSC)	Chr 22: 42.84 – 43.02 Mb	Chr 15: 83.26 – 83.35 Mb
PubMed search
- Wikidata
View/Edit Human	View/Edit Mouse

Protein kinase C and casein kinase substrate in neurons protein 2 (Pacsin 2) is a protein that in humans is encoded by the PACSIN2 gene. Pacsin 2 is involved in the formation of caveolae.

== Clinical significance ==
The variant rs2413739 in PACSIN2 has been associated with the activity of the enzyme thiopurine-methyltransferase during remission maintenance therapy of children with acute lymphoblastic leukemia and with the incidence of severe gastrointestinal adverse events during remission consolidation therapy of children with acute lymphoblastic leukemia, based mostly on the antimetabolites mercaptopurine and methotrexate.

== Interactions ==
PACSIN2 has been shown to interact with:

- Fas ligand,
- PACSIN1, and
- PACSIN3.
