= Decoy receptor 3 =

Protein found in humans

TNFRSF6B

Identifiers
- Aliases: TNFRSF6B, DCR3, DJ583P15.1.1, M68, M68E, TR6, tumor necrosis factor receptor superfamily member 6b, TNF receptor superfamily member 6b
- External IDs: OMIM: 603361; GeneCards: TNFRSF6B
Available structures
PDB	Human UniProt search: PDBe RCSB
PDB	List of PDB id codes 3K51, 3MHD, 3MI8, 4J6G, 4KGG, 4KGQ, 4MSV

Gene location (Human)
Chr.	Chromosome 20 (human)
Band	20q13.33	Start	63,696,652 bp
Band	20q13.33	End	63,698,684 bp
RNA expression pattern
Bgee	Human / Mouse (ortholog); Top expressed in: olfactory zone of nasal mucosa; spleen; subcutaneous adipose tissue; right lung; upper lobe of left lung; C1 segment; right hemisphere of cerebellum; appendix; anterior pituitary; amygdala / n/a; More reference expression data
BioGPS	n/a
Gene ontology
Molecular function	protein binding; tumor necrosis factor-activated receptor activity; signaling receptor activity
Cellular component	extracellular region; integral component of plasma membrane; extracellular space
Biological process	multicellular organism development; apoptotic signaling pathway; response to lipopolysaccharide; inflammatory response; tumor necrosis factor-mediated signaling pathway; negative regulation of apoptotic process; regulation of cell population proliferation; immune response; apoptotic process; negative regulation of cysteine-type endopeptidase activity involved in apoptotic process
Sources:Amigo / QuickGO
Orthologs
Databases	NCBI: entry; OMA: entry
Species	Human	Mouse
Entrez	8771	n/a
Ensembl	ENSG00000243509	n/a
UniProt	O95407	n/a
RefSeq (mRNA)	NM_032945; NM_003823	n/a
RefSeq (protein)	NP_003814	n/a
Location (UCSC)	Chr 20: 63.7 – 63.7 Mb	n/a
PubMed search		n/a
- Wikidata
View/Edit Human

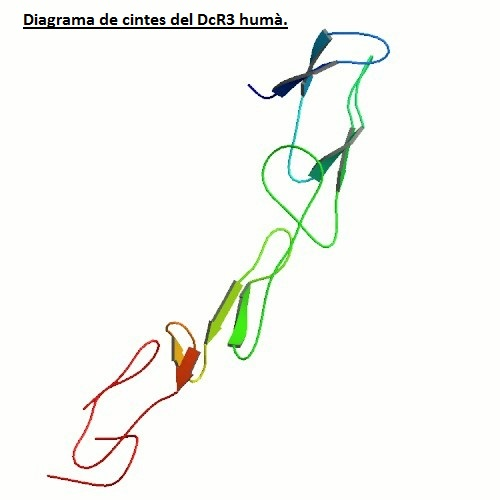

Decoy receptor 3 (Dcr3), also known as tumor necrosis factor receptor superfamily member 6B (TNFRSF6B), TR6 and M68, is a soluble protein of the tumor necrosis factor receptor superfamily which inhibits Fas ligand-induced apoptosis.

== Discovery ==
Dcr3 was identified in 1998 by the search of genes with homology to the TNFR gene superfamily in expressed sequence tag (EST) database.

== Structure ==
The open reading frame of TNFRSF6B encodes 300 amino acids with a 29-residue signal sequence and four tandem cystein-rich repeats. Two transcript variants encoding the same isoform, but differing in the 5' UTR, have been observed for this gene. Unlike most of the other members of TNFR superfamily, TNFRSF6 is a soluble protein which contains no transmembrane domain.

== Function ==
This gene belongs to the tumor necrosis factor receptor superfamily. It acts as a decoy receptor that competes with death receptors for ligand binding. The encoded protein is postulated to play a regulatory role in suppressing FasL- and LIGHT-mediated cell death and T cell activation as well as to induce angiogenesis via neutralization of TL1A. Overexpression of this gene has been noted in various tumors e.g. gastrointestinal tract tumors, and it is located in a gene-rich cluster on chromosome 20, with other potentially tumor-related genes.

== Interactions ==
TNFRSF6B has been shown to interact with:

- TNFSF14
- Fas ligand.
