= LIGHT (protein) =

Secreted protein of the TNF superfamily

TNFSF14

Identifiers
- Aliases: TNFSF14, CD258, HVEML, LIGHT, LTg, TR2, TNLG1D, tumor necrosis factor superfamily member 14, TNF superfamily member 14
- External IDs: OMIM: 604520; MGI: 1355317; GeneCards: TNFSF14
Available structures
| PDB | Ortholog search: PDBe RCSB |
| PDB | List of PDB id codes 4EN0, 4J6G, 4KG8, 4KGG, 4KGQ, 4RSU |

Gene location (Human)
| Chr. | Chromosome 19 (human) |
| Band | 19p13.3 | Start | 6,661,253 bp |
| Band | 19p13.3 | End | 6,670,588 bp |

Gene location (Mouse)
| Chr. | Chromosome 17 (mouse) |
| Band | 17|17 D | Start | 57,496,492 bp |
| Band | 17|17 D | End | 57,501,177 bp |
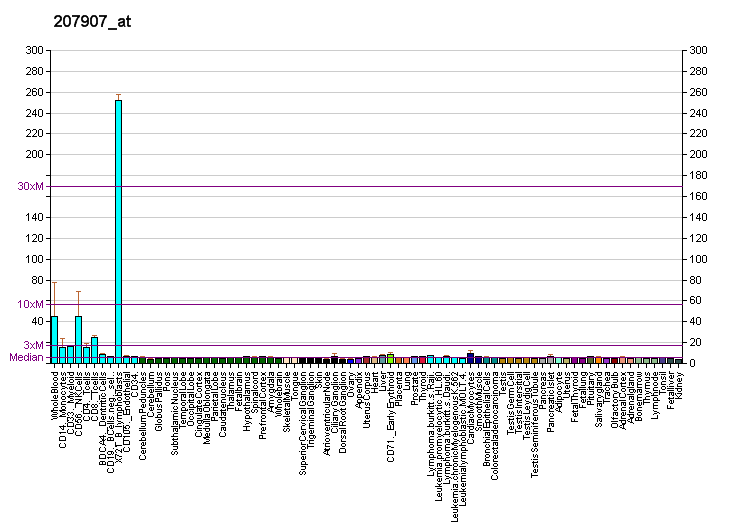
RNA expression pattern
| Bgee | Human / Mouse (ortholog); Top expressed in: right lobe of liver; blood; pericardium; parietal pleura; granulocyte; amniotic fluid; visceral pleura; left uterine tube; buccal mucosa cell; palpebral conjunctiva / Top expressed in: granulocyte; embryo; blood; bone marrow; thymus; yolk sac; spleen; proximal tubule; jejunum; lip; More reference expression data |
| BioGPS | More reference expression data |
Gene ontology
| Molecular function | signaling receptor binding; tumor necrosis factor receptor binding; cytokine activity; cysteine-type endopeptidase inhibitor activity involved in apoptotic process; protein binding; identical protein binding |
| Cellular component | extracellular region; cytoplasm; integral component of membrane; membrane; plasma membrane; extracellular space |
| Biological process | T cell costimulation; T cell proliferation; T cell homeostasis; positive regulation of T cell chemotaxis; apoptotic process; tumor necrosis factor-mediated signaling pathway; positive regulation of myoblast fusion; T cell activation; positive regulation of myoblast differentiation; cellular response to mechanical stimulus; immune response; signal transduction; negative regulation of cysteine-type endopeptidase activity involved in apoptotic process; regulation of signaling receptor activity; positive regulation of NIK/NF-kappaB signaling |
Sources:Amigo / QuickGO
Orthologs
| Databases | NCBI: entry; OMA: entry |
| Species | Human | Mouse |
| Entrez | 8740 | 50930 |
| Ensembl | ENSG00000125735 | ENSMUSG00000005824 |
| UniProt | O43557 | Q9QYH9 |
| RefSeq (mRNA) | NM_003807; NM_172014; NM_001376887 | NM_019418 |
| RefSeq (protein) | NP_003798; NP_742011; NP_001363816 | NP_062291 |
| Location (UCSC) | Chr 19: 6.66 – 6.67 Mb | Chr 17: 57.5 – 57.5 Mb |
| PubMed search |
- Wikidata
| View/Edit Human | View/Edit Mouse |

LIGHT, also known as tumor necrosis factor superfamily member 14 (TNFSF14), is a secreted protein of the TNF superfamily. It is recognized by herpesvirus entry mediator (HVEM), as well as decoy receptor 3.

== Nomenclature ==
LIGHT stands for "homologous to lymphotoxin, exhibits inducible expression and competes with HSV glycoprotein D for binding to herpesvirus entry mediator, a receptor expressed on T lymphocytes". In the cluster of differentiation terminology it is classified as CD258.

== Function ==
The protein encoded by this gene is a member of the tumor necrosis factor (TNF) ligand family. This protein is a ligand for TNFRSF14, which is a member of the tumor necrosis factor receptor superfamily, and which is also known as a herpesvirus entry mediator (HVEM). Furthermore, LIGHT interacts with the lymphotoxin β receptor (LTβR) to regulate the development of secondary lymphoid organs and tertiary lymphoid structures. Two alternatively spliced transcript variant encoding distinct isoforms have been reported.

This protein may function as a costimulatory factor for the activation of lymphoid cells and as a deterrent to infection by herpesvirus. This protein has been shown to stimulate the proliferation of T cells, trigger apoptosis of various tumor cells and play a role in vascular normalisation processes. This protein is also reported to prevent tumor necrosis factor alpha-mediated apoptosis in primary hepatocytes.

== Interactions ==
LIGHT has been shown to interact with TNFRSF14, TNFRSF6B, BIRC2, TRAF2 and TRAF3.

== Role in herpes simplex virus ==
Similar to how CD4 is the primary mediating receptor in HIV infection, the HSV glycoprotein (gD) binds to the HVEM receptor which is demanded by TNFSF14/LIGHT lowering the ability for LIGHT to activate the NFκB pathway. NFκB is a survival factor helping to inhibit apoptosis which triggers a pathway inhibiting caspase 8. When gD from HSV binds to HVEM, LIGHT is non-competitively inhibited from binding, encouraging apoptosis in the infected cell.
