= Tigatuzumab =

Monoclonal antibody

Monoclonal antibody
- Type: Whole antibody
- Source: Humanized (from mouse)
- Target: TNFRSF10B (TRAIL-R2)

Clinical data
- ATC code: none

Identifiers
- CAS Number: 918127-53-4
- ChemSpider: none
- UNII: 237GB6IDKO

Chemical and physical data
- Formula: C_{6406}H_{9924}N_{1716}O_{2012}S_{46}
- Molar mass: 144646.62 g·mol^{−1}

Tigatuzumab (CS-1008) is a monoclonal antibody for the treatment of cancer. As of October 2009, a clinical trial for the treatment of pancreatic cancer, Phase II trials for colorectal cancer, non-small cell lung cancer, and ovarian cancer have been completed.

The drug targets member 10b of the tumor necrosis factor receptor superfamily (TNFRSF10B, better known as death receptor 5 or trail receptor 2), a protein with limited expression in normal tissues but overexpressed in many kinds of tumours, including colon, gastric, pancreatic, lung, and cervical.

In 2015, a Phase I study was completed to investigate how biodistribution, quantitative tumor uptake, and antitumor response in patients with metastatic colorectal cancer was impacted by CS-1008. These objectives were tracked through use of trace-labeling and SPECT imaging over the course of treatment and found heterogeneity of tigatuzumab uptake in tumors, that tigatuzumab uptake is not dose dependent, and that tigatuzumab uptake is predictive of clinical response in the treatment of metastatic colorectal cancer.
