= Fas ligand =

Protein found in humans

FASLG

Identifiers
- Aliases: FASLG, ALPS1B, APT1LG1, APTL, CD178, CD95-L, CD95L, FASL, TNFSF6, TNLG1A, Fas ligand
- External IDs: OMIM: 134638; MGI: 99255; GeneCards: FASLG
Available structures
PDB	Ortholog search: PDBe RCSB
PDB	List of PDB id codes 4MSV

Gene location (Human)
Chr.	Chromosome 1 (human)
Band	1q24.3	Start	172,659,103 bp
Band	1q24.3	End	172,666,876 bp

Gene location (Mouse)
Chr.	Chromosome 1 (mouse)
Band	1 H2.1|1 69.95 cM	Start	161,608,258 bp
Band	1 H2.1|1 69.95 cM	End	161,616,064 bp
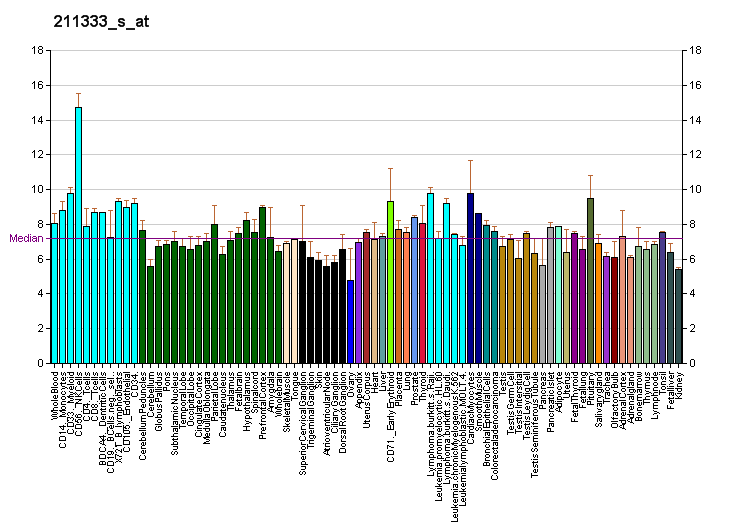

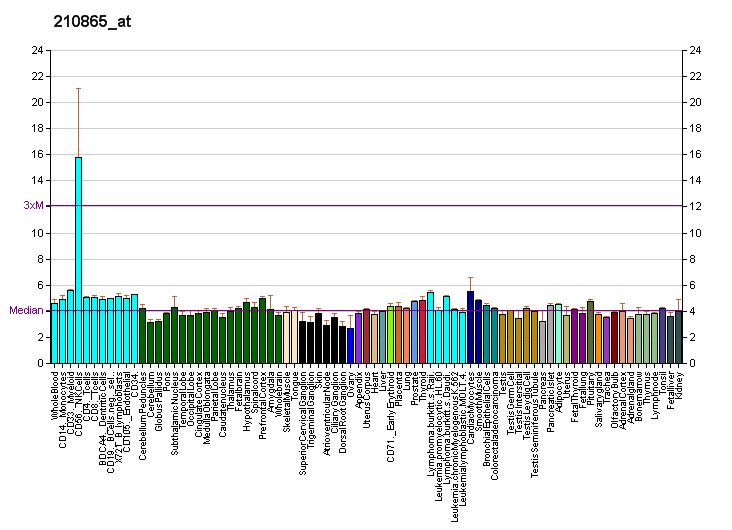
RNA expression pattern
Bgee	Human / Mouse (ortholog); Top expressed in: granulocyte; blood; lymph node; spleen; jejunal mucosa; mucosa of ileum; gallbladder; duodenum; rectum; bone marrow / Top expressed in: blastocyst; lumbar subsegment of spinal cord; embryo; blood; embryo; spermatid; placenta; spleen; decidua; duodenum; More reference expression data
BioGPS	More reference expression data
Gene ontology
Molecular function	cytokine activity; protein binding; tumor necrosis factor receptor binding; signaling receptor binding; death receptor binding
Cellular component	integral component of membrane; membrane; cytoplasmic vesicle lumen; plasma membrane; integral component of plasma membrane; cell surface; lysosomal lumen; caveola; perinuclear region of cytoplasm; membrane raft; lysosome; extracellular exosome; cytoplasmic vesicle; nucleus; external side of plasma membrane; extracellular region; extracellular space
Biological process	T cell apoptotic process; regulation of transcription, DNA-templated; cell-cell signaling; endosomal lumen acidification; negative regulation of transcription by RNA polymerase II; retinal cell programmed cell death; transcription, DNA-templated; response to lipopolysaccharide; positive regulation of neuron apoptotic process; positive regulation of endothelial cell apoptotic process; necroptotic signaling pathway; immune response; positive regulation of cell population proliferation; positive regulation of apoptotic process; positive regulation of I-kappaB kinase/NF-kappaB signaling; negative regulation of angiogenesis; regulation of extrinsic apoptotic signaling pathway via death domain receptors; cellular chloride ion homeostasis; response to growth factor; inflammatory cell apoptotic process; positive regulation of epidermal growth factor receptor signaling pathway; extrinsic apoptotic signaling pathway via death domain receptors; signal transduction; extrinsic apoptotic signaling pathway; activation of cysteine-type endopeptidase activity involved in apoptotic process; necroptosis; apoptotic signaling pathway; negative regulation of extrinsic apoptotic signaling pathway via death domain receptors; apoptotic process; release of sequestered calcium ion into cytosol by endoplasmic reticulum; regulation of signaling receptor activity; cytokine-mediated signaling pathway
Sources:Amigo / QuickGO
Orthologs
Databases	NCBI: entry; OMA: entry
Species	Human	Mouse
Entrez	356	14103
Ensembl	ENSG00000117560	ENSMUSG00000000817
UniProt	P48023	P41047
RefSeq (mRNA)	NM_001302746; NM_000639	NM_001205243; NM_010177
RefSeq (protein)	NP_000630; NP_001289675	NP_001192172; NP_034307
Location (UCSC)	Chr 1: 172.66 – 172.67 Mb	Chr 1: 161.61 – 161.62 Mb
PubMed search
- Wikidata
View/Edit Human	View/Edit Mouse

Fas ligand (FasL, also known as CD95L or Apo-1L) is a type-II transmembrane protein in the tumor necrosis factor (TNF) superfamily. It binds to the Fas receptor (CD95) to induce apoptosis, and also activates non-apoptotic pathways such as NF-κB and MAPK. FasL exists in membrane-bound and soluble forms, and is primarily expressed by cytotoxic T lymphocytes and natural killer cells. It plays a critical role in immune regulation, immune privilege, cancer, autoimmunity, and transplantation. The expression and function of FasL are tightly regulated to maintain immune homeostasis.

== Structure ==
Fas ligand operates as a type-II transmembrane protein through its membership in the tumor necrosis factor (TNF) superfamily. It operates under its official names FasL and CD95L or Apo-1L. With 281 amino acids the protein forms three identifiable structural components by including an intracellular N-terminal domain then follows with one transmembrane domain that leads to an extracellular C-terminal domain. The FasL binding activity rests in its extracellular domain which triggers Fas receptor engagement to start apoptotic signals.

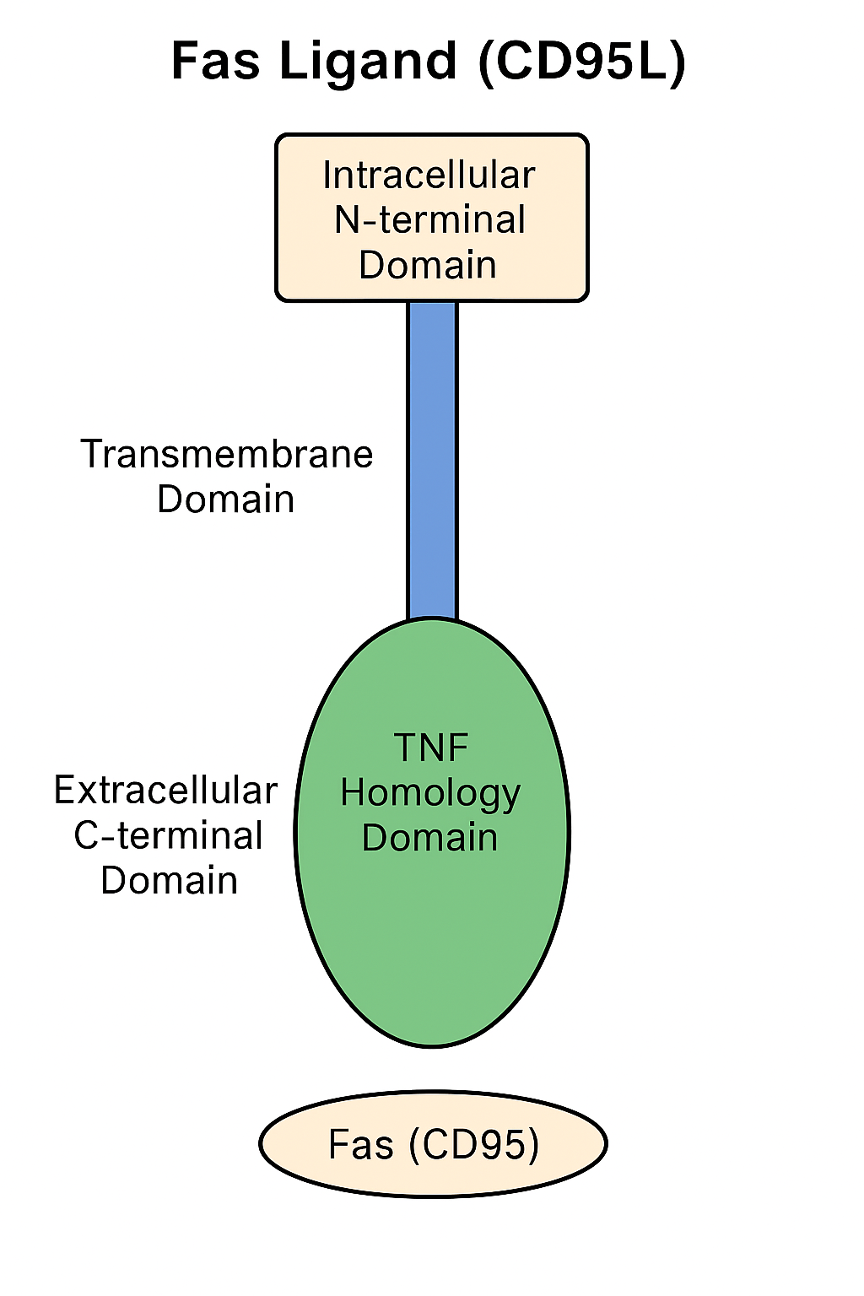
Simple illustration of the structure of Fas ligand

The biological existence of FasL occurs through two different forms which are membrane-bound and soluble. The membrane-bound protein exists as three identical subunits which serve as both the receptor activation mechanism and primary factor for complete apoptotic functionality. The soluble form of FasL (sFasL) results from metalloproteinase-mediated proteolytic cleavage of the membrane-bound FasL particularly through matrix metalloproteinase-7 (MMP-7). Despite its ability to attach with Fas receptors the soluble form of FasL possesses much less potency for apoptosis induction while researchers assume it functions to modify immune system activities.

The apoptosis-relevant domain known as TNF homology domain (THD) enables FasL structural features common to other members of TNF family protein ligands to promote both receptor interaction and trimer formation. The structural properties enable the ligand to fulfill its biological role and its selective killing of Fas-expressing cells.

== Function ==
Fas ligand triggers target cell apoptotic processes by binding to its receptor Fas (CD95) which is present on numerous cell types. The Fas receptor changes from its monomeric state to a trimeric form after ligand binding and attracts the FADD (Fas-associated death domain) protein. The recruitment of procaspase-8 occurs through FADD until the death-inducing signaling complex (DISC) is formed. The DISC complex triggers a succession of activated caspases that perform substrate cleavage activities resulting in apoptotic cellular break down.

FasL-mediated apoptosis plays several important biological functions in human physiology. The peripheral immune system depends on FasL to function properly because it removes lymphocytes that attack themselves. The immune response contraction phase is dependent on FasL because this molecule acts as a key factor to eliminate activated lymphocytes after pathogen elimination. FasL enables homeostatic maintenance of tissues by causing elimination of virus-infected cells and cells with transformed potential.

The apoptosis-related role of FasL has been identified while scientists have also discovered that FasL activates both NF-κB and MAPK signaling pathways that support cell survival conditions and cause cellular inflammation and proliferation. The Fas-FasL signaling system operates as apoptotic and non-apoptotic roles because of environmental elements.

=== Immune privilege ===
Fas ligand is a principal mediator of immune privilege, an immunoregulatory process found in some tissues to shield them from immune-mediated destruction. Immune-privileged sites are the eye, brain, testis, and placenta. These tissues express FasL constitutively or upon local immune stimulation to kill invading Fas-expressing lymphocytes by apoptosis.

In the eye, for instance, FasL expression by the corneal endothelium and retinal pigment epithelium is responsible for immune tolerance of the transplanted tissues and minimizing immune rejection. Likewise, the testis and placenta employ FasL to shield the germ cells and the developing fetus, respectively, against potentially damaging immune attack.

The function of FasL in immune privilege is not purely protective; anomalous or inordinate FasL expression by these tissues potentially can lead to pathological inflammation or tissue injury. Nevertheless, FasL remains an important aspect of immune evasion, both physiologically as well as pathologically, such as in tumors that simulate the conditions of immune privilege.

=== Receptor ===
- FasR: The Fas receptor (FasR), also known as CD95, is one of the most studied members of the death receptor family. The gene encoding FasR is located on chromosome 10 in humans and chromosome 19 in mice. Studies have identified up to eight splice variants, which give rise to seven different isoforms of the protein. Many of these isoforms are linked to rare haplotypes, often associated with disease states. The apoptosis-inducing Fas receptor, referred to as isoform 1, is a type I transmembrane protein that consists of three cysteine-rich pseudo-repeats, a transmembrane domain, and an intracellular death domain.
- DcR3: Decoy receptor 3 (DcR3) is a recently discovered decoy receptor in the tumor necrosis factor (TNF) superfamily. It binds to FasL, LIGHT, and TL1A. DcR3 is a soluble receptor that lacks signal transduction capabilities, hence its name "decoy". It functions to inhibit FasR-FasL interactions by competitively binding to membrane-bound Fas ligand, thereby neutralizing its activity.

== Expression ==
Active cytotoxic T lymphocytes (CTLs) and natural killer (NK) cells mainly express Fas ligand to use this molecule for target apoptosis regulation through their immune effector functions. Fas ligand localizes to regions of immune privilege including eye and testes and placenta to get rid of invading immune cells thus establishing immunological tolerance.

The regulatory processes for FasL expression function at both transcriptional and post-transcriptional phases. The gene expression of FasL gets controlled by cytokines that include interleukin-2 (IL-2) and tumor necrosis factor-alpha (TNF-α) as well as interferon-gamma (IFN-γ). The expression of FasL in immune cells gets significantly enhanced through exposure to stress signals as well as antigen stimulation combined with T cell receptor activation.

== Regulation ==
The expression and function of Fas ligand are regulated tightly at several levels to provide for correct immune responses and avoid tissue injury.

=== Transcriptional and post-transcriptional control ===
FasL gene expression is controlled by transcription factors like NFAT (nuclear factor of activated T cells), AP-1 (activator protein 1), and NF-κB. These transcription factors are activated upon T cell receptor (TCR) stimulation, cytokine signaling, and cellular stress. Post-transcriptionally, the stability of FasL mRNA and translation may be controlled by RNA-binding proteins and microRNAs.

=== Proteolytic cleavage ===
The cleavage of membrane-bound FasL into its soluble form is facilitated by metalloproteinases, such as matrix metalloproteinase-7 (MMP-7). Cleavage diminishes the apoptotic activity of FasL and can serve to suppress immune responses or rechannel Fas signaling into non-apoptotic pathways.

=== Intracellular modulators ===
In the cell, multiple regulatory proteins influence the downstream Fas signaling pathway. c-FLIP, a well-established caspase-8 recruitment inhibitor at the DISC and thus preventing apoptosis, is also present. Protein components in FasL ubiquitination and degradation help regulate its function to fine-tune it.

== Signaling pathways ==
When it binds to its receptor, FasL triggers the classical extrinsic apoptotic pathway but also induces a number of non-apoptotic signal transduction cascades based on the cellular context and availability of intracellular regulatory proteins.

=== Apoptotic signaling ===
The apoptotic pathway starts with trimerization of Fas receptor and recruitment of the adaptor molecule FADD. FADD brings about the recruitment of procaspase-8, resulting in the formation of the death-inducing signaling complex (DISC). Activated caspase-8 subsequently activates downstream effector caspases, such as caspase-3, to cause apoptosis through DNA fragmentation, cell shrinkage, and membrane blebbing.

=== Non-apoptotic signaling ===
FasL-Fas interaction in certain cell types activates non-apoptotic pathways. These are:

- NF-κB pathway: Regulates the induction of pro-inflammatory cytokines and anti-apoptotic proteins.
- MAPK pathways: Regulate cell proliferation, differentiation, and survival. The result of Fas signaling—either apoptotic or non-apoptotic—is governed by the levels of expression of regulatory proteins including c-FLIP, inhibitor of apoptosis proteins (IAPs), and cellular surroundings (e.g., availability of survival factors or immune cytokines). Its dual capability renders Fas signaling versatile and complex in immune modulation and disease.

Overview of signal transduction pathways involved in apoptosis

== Interactions ==
Fas ligand has been shown to interact with:

- CASP8,
- EZR,
- FADD,
- FNBP1,
- FYN,
- FAS,
- Grb2,
- PACSIN2, and
- TNFRSF6B.

== Clinical significance ==
FasL-Fas signaling axis is a central regulator of immune function, and its dysregulation has been implicated in the pathogenesis of many disease processes. Its clinical significance ranges across autoimmune diseases, cancer immunology, and transplant medicine.

=== Autoimmune diseases ===
Abnormal Fas-FasL signaling has been linked with survival of autoreactive T cells and B cells, leading to disruption of peripheral immune tolerance. One of the best-studied disorders in this regard is autoimmune lymphoproliferative syndrome (ALPS), a genetic disorder due to mutations in Fas or FasL that leads to lymphocytosis and the emergence of autoimmune disease. Likewise, reduced FasL function has been associated with systemic lupus erythematosus (SLE), where impaired apoptosis of self-reactive cells plays a role in disease etiology.

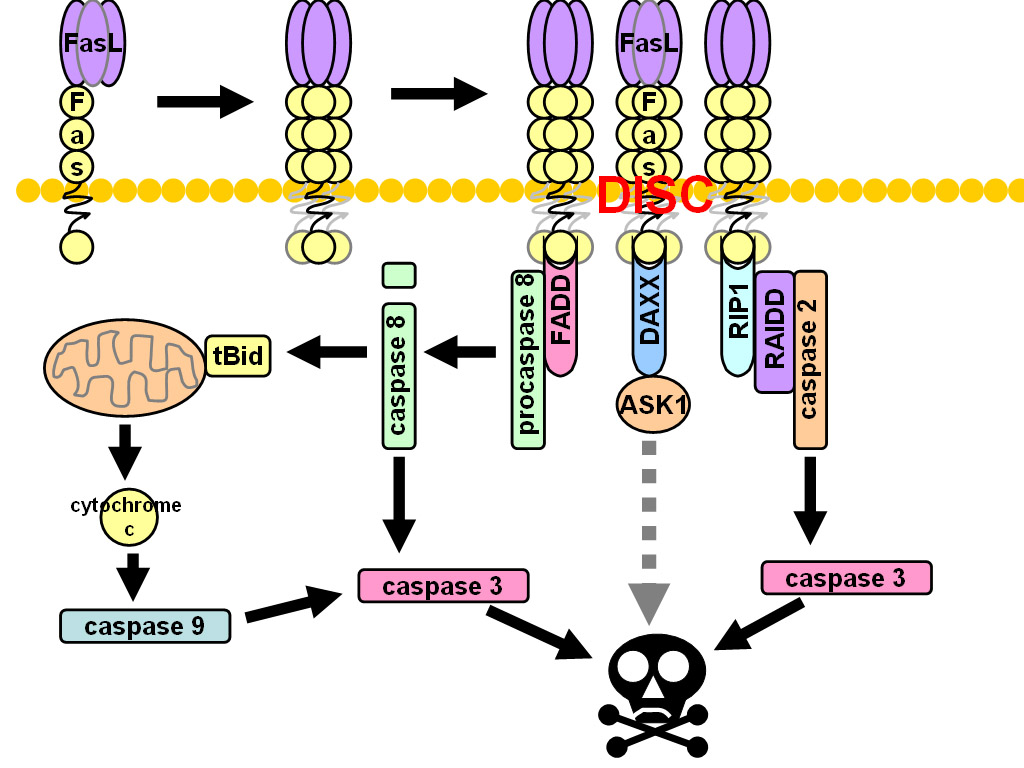
Signaling pathways of Fas. Dashed grey lines represent multiple steps in JNK signaling.

=== Cancer ===
FasL expression by cancer cells is a strategy of immune escape. Several tumor cells express FasL on their surface to trigger apoptosis among Fas-expressing TILs, especially cytotoxic CD8+ T cells. This is called the "Fas counterattack", by which tumors are enabled to evade immune surveillance and proceed with their proliferation. Additionally, the tumor environment can secrete soluble FasL, again contributing to local immunosuppression.

=== Transplantation ===
In transplantation environments, FasL participates in both graft tolerance and rejection. Although the expression of FasL within donor tissues can facilitate apoptosis in host immune cells and maintain graft survival, overexpression of FasL can have the opposite effect of causing inflammation and damage to the graft. Experimental evidence has indicated that manipulation of FasL levels would modulate the balance between graft tolerance and rejection.

=== Evolutionary change ===
Researchers at the University of California Davis Comprehensive Cancer Center identified a small genetic mutation in FasL that may explain why humans struggle to target solid tumors effectively. This mutation makes FasL more susceptible to deactivation by plasmin, a tumor-associated enzyme. This vulnerability is exclusive to humans and is absent in non-human primates, like chimpanzees.

== See also ==
- FAF1
