= Motifs targeted by APC/C =

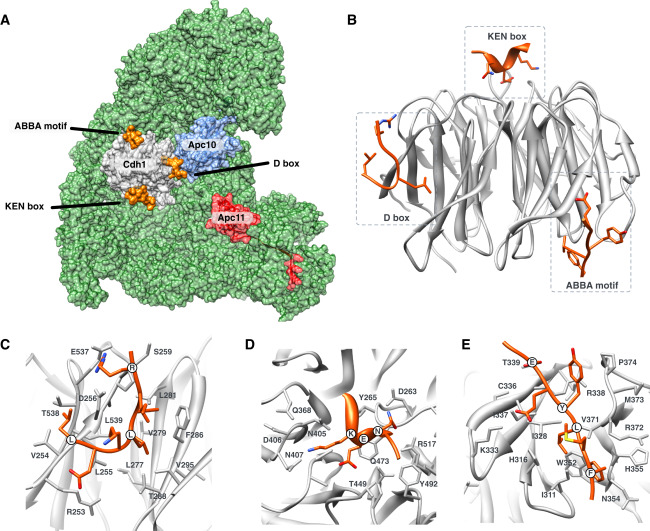
APC/C structure indicating where the linear motifs from substrates bind.

The anaphase- promoting complex or cyclosome (APC/C) is a highly specific ubiquitin protein ligase responsible for triggering events of late mitosis. In early mitosis, Cdc20 levels rise and APC/C binds to form active APC/CCdc20. This then leads to the destruction of mitotic cyclins, securin, and other proteins to trigger chromosome separation in anaphase. In early anaphase, Cdk1 is inactivated, leading to the activation of Cdh1, the other activator subunit of APC/C. This then triggers the degradation of Cdc20 and leads to the activation of APC/CCdh1 through G1 to suppress S- phase cyclin-Cdk activity. At the end of G1, APC/CCdh1 is inactivated and S- phase and mitotic cyclins gets reaccumulate as the cell progresses to S phase.

APC/C finds its substrates via short, linear sequence motifs or degrons found in its substrates. These degrons can be split into three major groups: destruction boxes, KEN boxes, and ABBA motifs. Binding pockets on the surface of activator subunits of Cdc20 or Cdh1 interact with the degrons on the substrates to target them for ubiquitination and degradation to trigger specific events in the cell cycle.

== Degrons targeted by APC/C ==
The APC/C is a binding platform that associates with an activator subunit (Cdc20 or Cdh1) which has binding pockets on its surface to interact with degrons on the substrate. The three main degrons that the APC/C interacts with are destruction box (also known as D box), the KEN box, and the ABBA motif. Most APC targets contain the D and the KEN box. These degrons are typically located in largely unstructured regions of the substrates.

- Destruction Box (D Box)

The D box is a sequence motif found in many targets of the APC with the consensus RxxLxxxxN amino acid sequence. R is arginine, X is any amino acid, L is leucine, and N is asparagine. This binding pocket involves the activator WD40 domain, which is located in the C- terminal half of the APC/C activator subunit, and a site on the Apc10/ Doc1 subunit of the APC/C. RxxL motifs on target substrates contain an acidic patch and an aliphatic (non- aromatic carbon chain) pocket. There is a hydrogen bond between the acidic position on the D box and an arginine amino acid on the activator surface.

- KEN Box

The KEN box is a sequence motif targeted by the APC with the consensus KENxxxN (K is lysine and E is glutamate). This motif binds on the top surface of the WD40 domain of the APC activator subunit (Cdh1 or Cdc20) and forms an underwound helix with a tight turn in the pocket, which creates charged residues of the consensus to contact the binding pocket on the activator surface.

One interesting example is the KEN box located on the activating subunit of the APC/C Cdc20, which is preferentially recognized by Cdh1. This ensures degradation of Cdc20 following Cdh1 dephosphorylation and activation at the exit of mitosis.

- ABBA motif

The ABBA motif recognizes peptides with a consensus [ILVF]x[ILMVP][FHY]x[DE]. Only a small number of substrates have been shown to have this motif. This motif targets S phase cyclins like Clb5 and Cyclin A2, which are the first substrates that get degraded in mitosis.

=== Multiple APC/C motifs on substrates ===
Substrates can have more than one motif and doing so makes them particularly good substrates for the APC/C to target. For example, S- phase cyclin5 (Clb5), a protein in budding yeast, contains the Ken Box, D Box, ABBA motif, and a Cks1 co-factor to be targeted in pre-metaphase for degron cooperativity. Cyclin A2, a protein in humans, contains the Ken Box, ABBA motif, D Box, and a Cks1 co-factor to be targeted during prometaphase.
