= Death receptor 5 =

Protein found in humans

TNFRSF10B
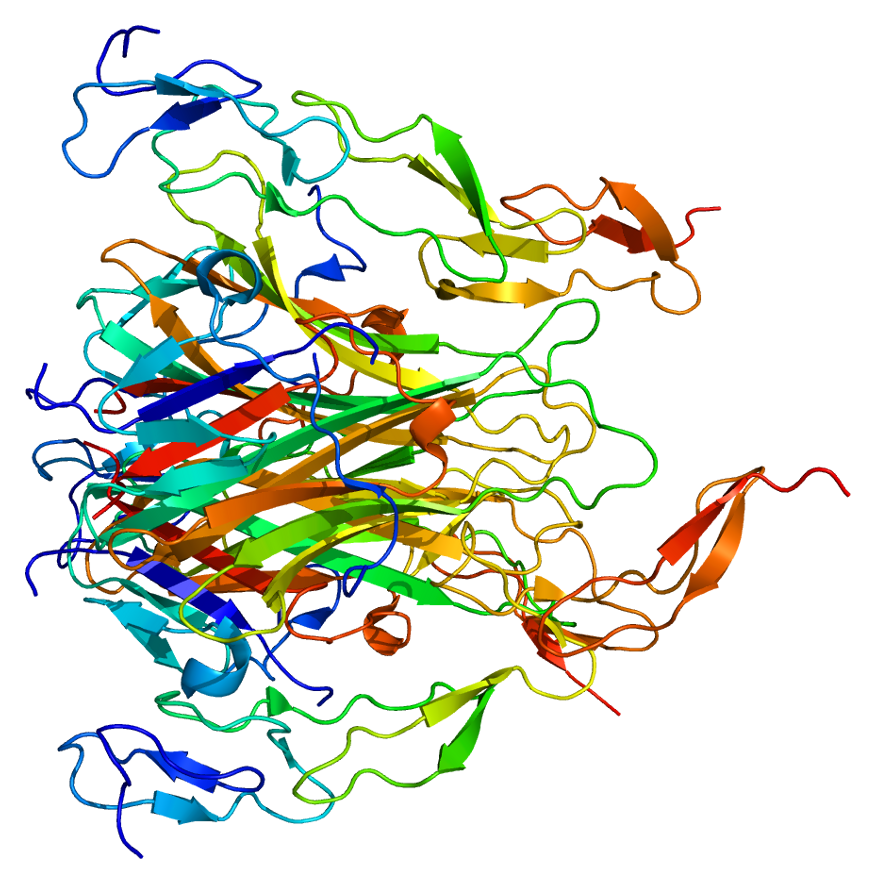

Identifiers
- Aliases: TNFRSF10B, CD262, DR5, KILLER, KILLER/DR5, TRAIL-R2, TRAILR2, TRICK2, TRICK2A, TRICK2B, TRICKB, ZTNFR9, tumor necrosis factor receptor superfamily member 10b, TNF receptor superfamily member 10b
- External IDs: OMIM: 603612; MGI: 1341090; GeneCards: TNFRSF10B
Available structures
PDB	Ortholog search: PDBe RCSB
PDB	List of PDB id codes 1D0G, 1D4V, 1DU3, 1ZA3, 2H9G, 4I9X, 4N90, 4OD2, 3X3F

Gene location (Human)
Chr.	Chromosome 8 (human)
Band	8p21.3	Start	23,020,133 bp
Band	8p21.3	End	23,069,031 bp

Gene location (Mouse)
Chr.	Chromosome 14 (mouse)
Band	14|14 D2	Start	70,004,921 bp
Band	14|14 D2	End	70,021,860 bp
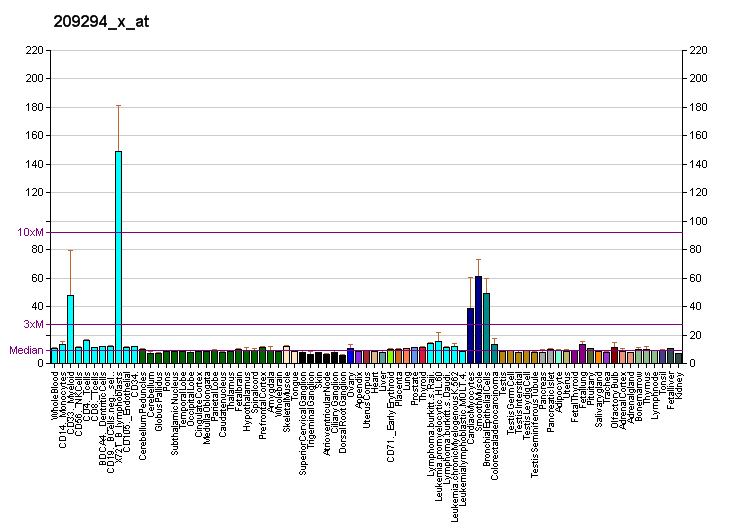

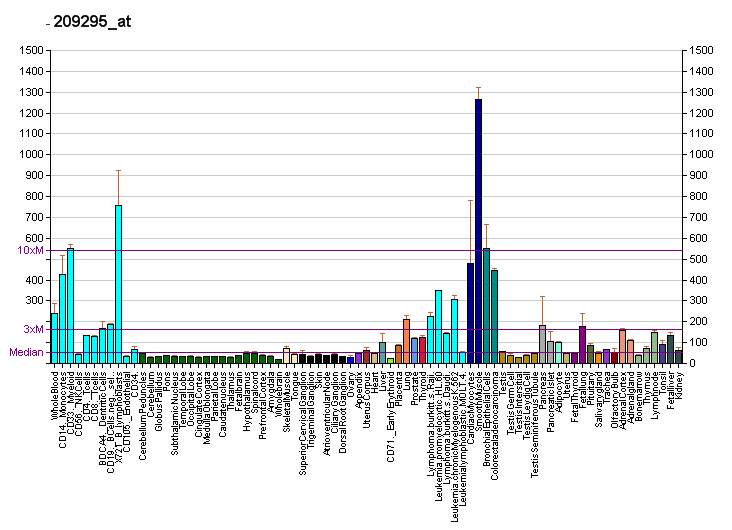

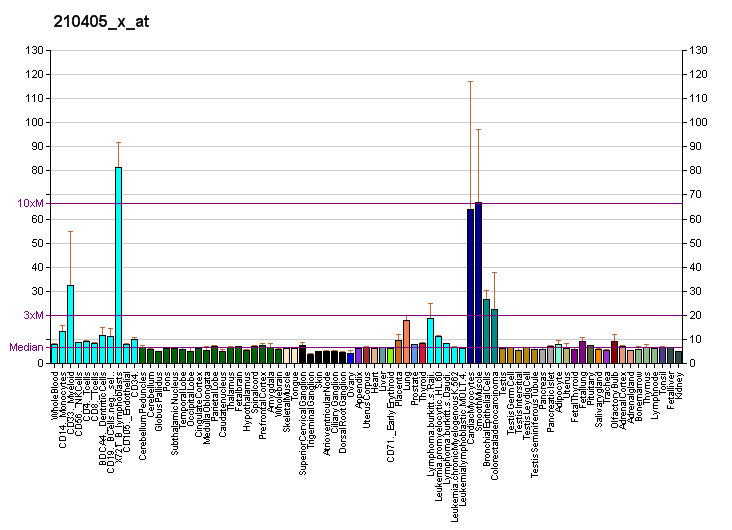
RNA expression pattern
Bgee	Human / Mouse (ortholog); Top expressed in: cartilage tissue; mucosa of urinary bladder; blood; vena cava; stromal cell of endometrium; gallbladder; germinal epithelium; pericardium; visceral pleura; tibia / Top expressed in: urethra; female urethra; male urethra; genital tubercle; morula; endothelial cell of lymphatic vessel; tail of embryo; lens; embryo; embryo; More reference expression data
BioGPS	More reference expression data
Gene ontology
Molecular function	TRAIL binding; protein binding; tumor necrosis factor-activated receptor activity; signaling receptor activity
Cellular component	membrane; plasma membrane; integral component of plasma membrane; cell surface; intracellular anatomical structure; integral component of membrane
Biological process	activation of NF-kappaB-inducing kinase activity; response to endoplasmic reticulum stress; multicellular organism development; cell surface receptor signaling pathway; response to lipopolysaccharide; intrinsic apoptotic signaling pathway in response to endoplasmic reticulum stress; cellular response to mechanical stimulus; regulation of cell population proliferation; immune response; positive regulation of I-kappaB kinase/NF-kappaB signaling; regulation of extrinsic apoptotic signaling pathway via death domain receptors; inflammatory response; activation of cysteine-type endopeptidase activity involved in apoptotic process; signal transduction; tumor necrosis factor-mediated signaling pathway; apoptotic process; negative regulation of extrinsic apoptotic signaling pathway via death domain receptors; leukocyte migration; extrinsic apoptotic signaling pathway via death domain receptors; regulation of apoptotic process; negative regulation of cysteine-type endopeptidase activity involved in apoptotic process; TRAIL-activated apoptotic signaling pathway; positive regulation of apoptotic process
Sources:Amigo / QuickGO
Orthologs
Databases	NCBI: entry; OMA: entry
Species	Human	Mouse
Entrez	8795	21933
Ensembl	ENSG00000120889	ENSMUSG00000022074
UniProt	O14763	Q9QZM4
RefSeq (mRNA)	NM_003842; NM_147187	NM_020275
RefSeq (protein)	NP_003833; NP_671716	NP_064671
Location (UCSC)	Chr 8: 23.02 – 23.07 Mb	Chr 14: 70 – 70.02 Mb
PubMed search
- Wikidata
View/Edit Human	View/Edit Mouse

Death receptor 5 (DR5), also known as TRAIL receptor 2 (TRAILR2) and tumor necrosis factor receptor superfamily member 10B (TNFRSF10B), is a cell surface receptor of the TNF-receptor superfamily that binds TRAIL and mediates apoptosis.

== Function ==
The protein encoded by this gene is a member of the TNF-receptor superfamily, and contains an intracellular death domain. This receptor can be activated by tumor necrosis factor-related apoptosis inducing ligand (TNFSF10/TRAIL/APO-2L), and transduces apoptosis signal. Mice have a homologous gene, tnfrsf10b, that has been essential in the elucidation of the function of this gene in humans. Studies with FADD-deficient mice suggested that FADD, a death domain containing adaptor protein, is required for the apoptosis mediated by this protein.

== Interactions ==
DR5 has been shown to interact with:

- Caspase 8,
- Caspase 10,
- FADD, and
- TRAIL.

== Cancer therapy ==
Monoclonal antibodies targeting DR5 have been developed and are currently under clinical trials for patients suffer from a variety of cancer types, see Tigatuzumab (CS-1008).

Luminescent iridium complex-peptide hybrids, serving as TRAIL mimics, have been designed, which target the death receptors DR4 and DR5 on cancer cells and induce their apoptosis.

== See also ==
- Cluster of differentiation
- Tumor necrosis factor receptor
- Tigatuzumab
