= Death domain =

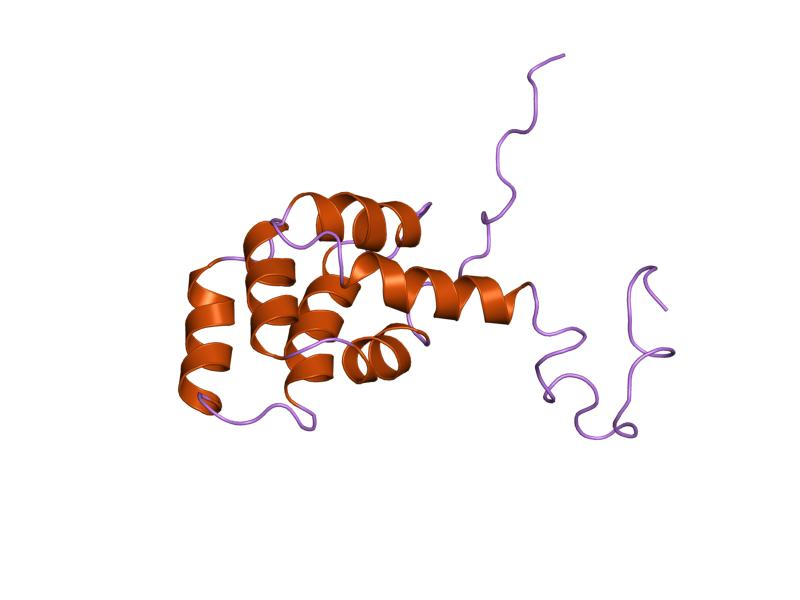
- Structure of the Fas (APO-1/CD95) death domain.

Identifiers
- Symbol: Death
- Pfam: PF00531
- ECOD: 110.1.1
- InterPro: IPR000488
- SMART: DEATH
- PROSITE: PDOC50017
- SCOP2: 1ddf / SCOPe / SUPFAM
- CDD: cd01670
Available protein structures:
- PDB: 1a1w, 1a1z, 1d2z, 1ddf, 1e3y, 1e41, 1fad, 1ich, 1ik7, 1ngr, 1wh4, 1wmg, 1ygo, 2gf5 IPR000488 PF00531 (ECOD; PDBsum)
- AlphaFold: IPR000488; PF00531

The death domain (DD) is a protein interaction module composed of a bundle of six alpha-helices. DD is a subclass of protein motif known as the death fold and is related in sequence and structure to the death effector domain (DED) and the caspase recruitment domain (CARD), which work in similar pathways and show similar interaction properties. DD bind each other forming oligomers. Mammals have numerous and diverse DD-containing proteins. Within these proteins, the DD domains can be found in combination with other domains, including: CARDs, DEDs, ankyrin repeats, caspase-like folds, kinase domains, leucine zippers, leucine-rich repeats (LRR), TIR domains, and ZU5 domains.

Some DD-containing proteins are involved in the regulation of apoptosis and inflammation through their activation of caspases and NF-κB, which typically involves interactions with TNF (tumour necrosis factor) cytokine receptors. In humans, eight of the over 30 known TNF receptors contain DD in their cytoplasmic tails; several of these TNF receptors use caspase activation as a signaling mechanism. The DD mediates self-association of these receptors, thus giving the signal to downstream events that lead to apoptosis. Other DD-containing proteins, such as ankyrin, MyD88 and pelle, are probably not directly involved in cell death signalling. DD-containing proteins also have links to innate immunity, communicating with Toll-like receptors through bipartite adapter proteins such as MyD88.

The DD superfamily is one of the largest and most studied domain superfamilies. It currently comprises four subfamilies, the death domain (DD) subfamily, the death effector domain (DED) subfamily, the caspase recruitment domain (CARD) subfamily and the pyrin domain (PYD) subfamily. These proteins are evolutionarily conserved in many multicellular organisms such as mammals, Drosophila and C. elegans. Based on a genome analysis, there are 32 DDs, 7 DEDs, 28 CARDs and 19 PYDs in the human genome.

Due to the large size of the death domain family protein superfamily, some death domain proteins may have a role to play in cancer and many other infections through several families of DD-proteins and specific gene alterations that have a downstream function to induce cell apoptosis. Many of these alterations occur in genes encoding mediators of apoptosis or necroptosis, potentially enabling the development of resistance to cell death, an important hallmark of cancer. Many cancers contain an oncogene that will inhibit the major histocompatibility complex (MHC) on the cell surface from presenting antigens to immune cells. Many of these malignancies have a subset of cases harboring genomic alterations in components of intrinsic or extrinsic cell death pathways, including amplification and overexpression of the Fas-associated via death domain (FADD) and inhibitor of apoptosis proteins (IAP), as well as mutations in caspase-encoding genes. One example of this can be seen in head and neck squamous cell carcinomas. Head and neck squamous cell carcinomas are among the cancers with the highest frequency of deregulation in genes encoding for cell death pathway constituents, with nearly half of all cases exhibiting such genomic alterations.

In addition to cancer, deregulation of death receptor protein signaling and death domain recruitment is seen to influence many other human diseases. Notably, the Fas death domain can have mutations that lead to autoimmune lymphoproliferative syndrome (ALPS), lung cancer, and squamous cell carcinoma. The defective in Fas signaling can lead to a disruption in the function of the death inducing signaling complex (DISC).

Specifically, in ALPS, cell apoptosis that occurs via the CD95 pathway is found to be vital in controlling the proliferation of activated lymphocytes and regulating lymphocyte homeostasis. Notably, a two-point mutation that occurs at the A1009G and E256G sites can cause a defect in apoptotic pathways in people who have ALPS (Peters, 1999). Most patients with ALPS have mutations in the Fas gene and more than 70 mutations have been mapped to its intracellular DD.

== See also ==
- Death Domain database
