= Death effector domain =

InterPro Domain

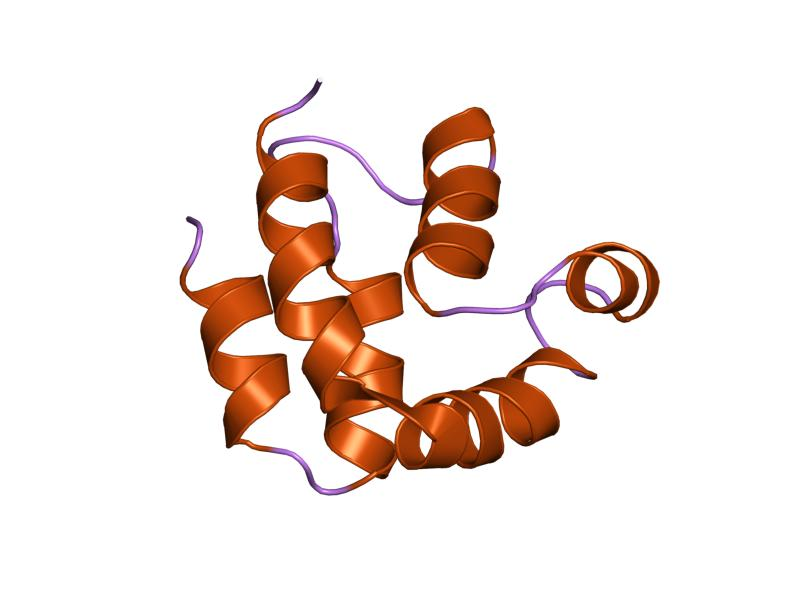
- structure of the FADD (Mort1) death-effector domain.

Identifiers
- Symbol: DED
- Pfam: PF01335
- InterPro: IPR001875
- SMART: DED
- PROSITE: PS50168
- SCOP2: 1a1z / SCOPe / SUPFAM
- CDD: cd00045
Available protein structures:
- PDB: 1a1w, 1a1z, 1e3y, 1e41, 1n3k, 2gf5 IPR001875 PF01335 (ECOD; PDBsum)
- AlphaFold: IPR001875; PF01335

The death-effector domain (DED) is a protein interaction domain found only in eukaryotes that regulates a variety of cellular signalling pathways. The DED domain is found in inactive procaspases (cysteine proteases) and proteins that regulate caspase activation in the apoptosis cascade such as FAS-associating death domain-containing protein (FADD). FADD recruits procaspase 8 and procaspase 10 into a death induced signaling complex (DISC). This recruitment is mediated by a homotypic interaction between the procaspase DED and a second DED that is death effector domain in an adaptor protein that is directly associated with activated TNF receptors. Complex formation allows proteolytic activation of procaspase into the active caspase form which results in the initiation of apoptosis (cell death). Structurally the DED domain are a subclass of protein motif known as the death fold and contains 6 alpha helices, that closely resemble the structure of the Death domain (DD).

== Structure ==
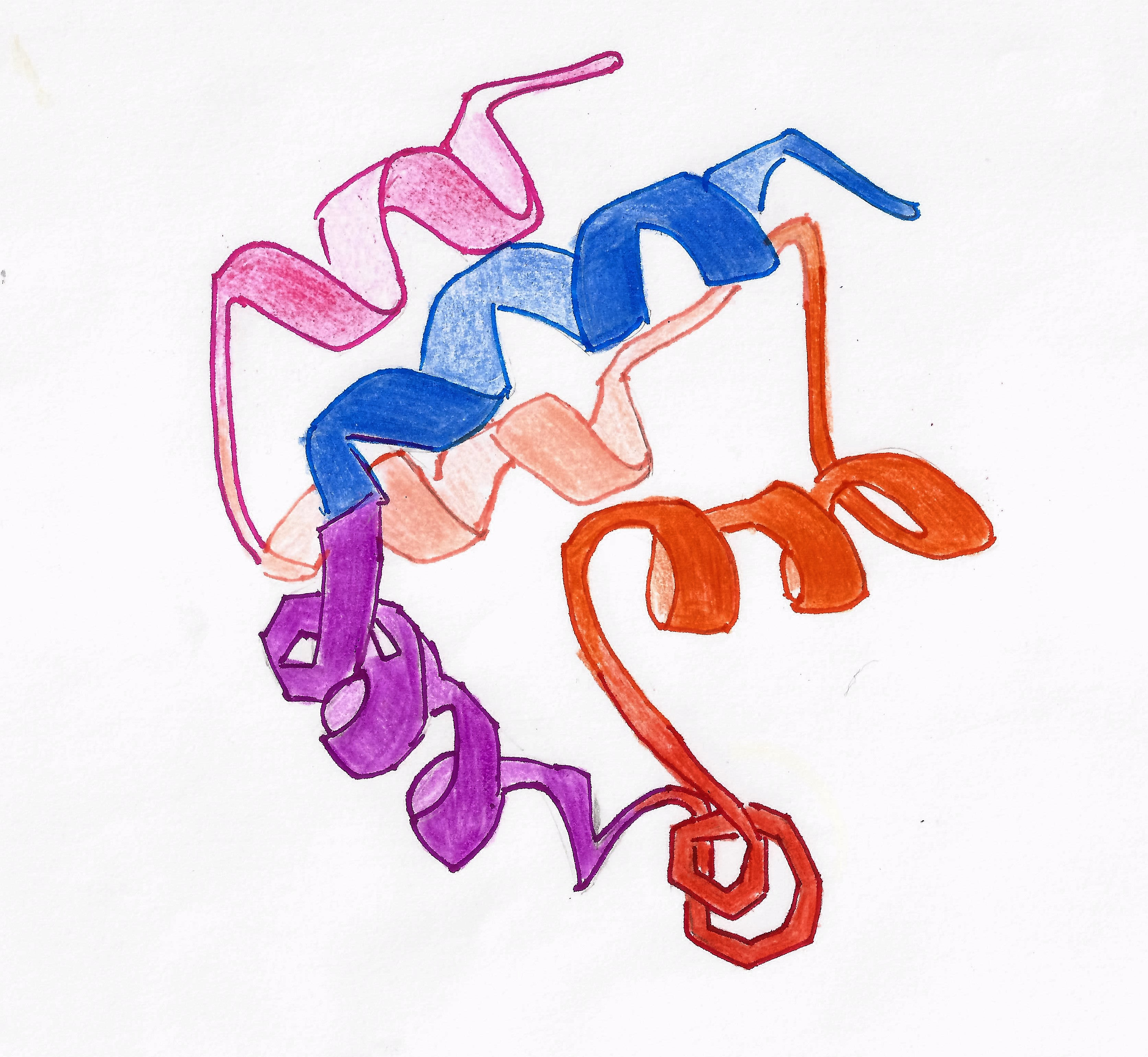
Tertiary structure of DED in FADD protein

DED is a subfamily of the DD superfamily (other recognizable domains in this superfamily are: caspase-recruitment domain (CARD), pyrin domain (PYD) and death domain (DD)). The subfamilies resemble structurally one another, all of them (and DED in particular) are composed of a bundle of 6 alpha-helices, but they diverge in the surface features.

The complete primary structure of this proteic domain has not been consensually defined. Some studies described residues 2-184, but C-terminus and N-terminus residues are not identified yet. The presence of amino acids that determine the solubility and aggregation to DED allowed to identify DED's in different proteins, such as caspase-8 and MC159. The secondary structure of the domain, as said, is built by 6 alpha-helices.

The tertiary structure of the domain has been described from the crystallization of caspase 8 in the human. The method used to describe the structure was X-RAY diffraction and the resolution obtained is 2.2 Å. DEDs in this protein show an asymmetric unit dimer, with its interface contains two hydrogen bonding networks, that appear as a filamentous structure. DED's function is determined by its structure. As far as it is known, the homotypic interactions that activate caspase and trigger apoptosis are mediated by asymmetrical surface contacts between partners (like DED1 and DED2 in the caspase-8 case). The residues that form the surfaces are typically charged amino acids, but a short hydrophobic patch can also be observed on the interactive surface of the domain.

== Function ==
DED domain is best known for its role in apoptosis. However, DED-containing proteins are also involved in other cellular processes so that they control both life and death cell decisions.

=== Extrinsic apoptosis ===
Apoptosis is a controlled and programmed cell death that confers advantages during an organism lifecycle. The extrinsic pathway is directed by a family of proteases which become active in response to death stimuli. To know the role of DEDs in this process is important to observe the formation of the multiprotein death-including signalling complex (DISC).

DR4, TRAIL-R2 and CD95 are death receptors (members of TNF receptor superfamily) which interact together using their intracellular death domains (DDs). The DD of FADD, a protein containing a DED, can then interact with these DDs described. Here the function of FADD DED is to create a stabilized structure by self-associating FADD.

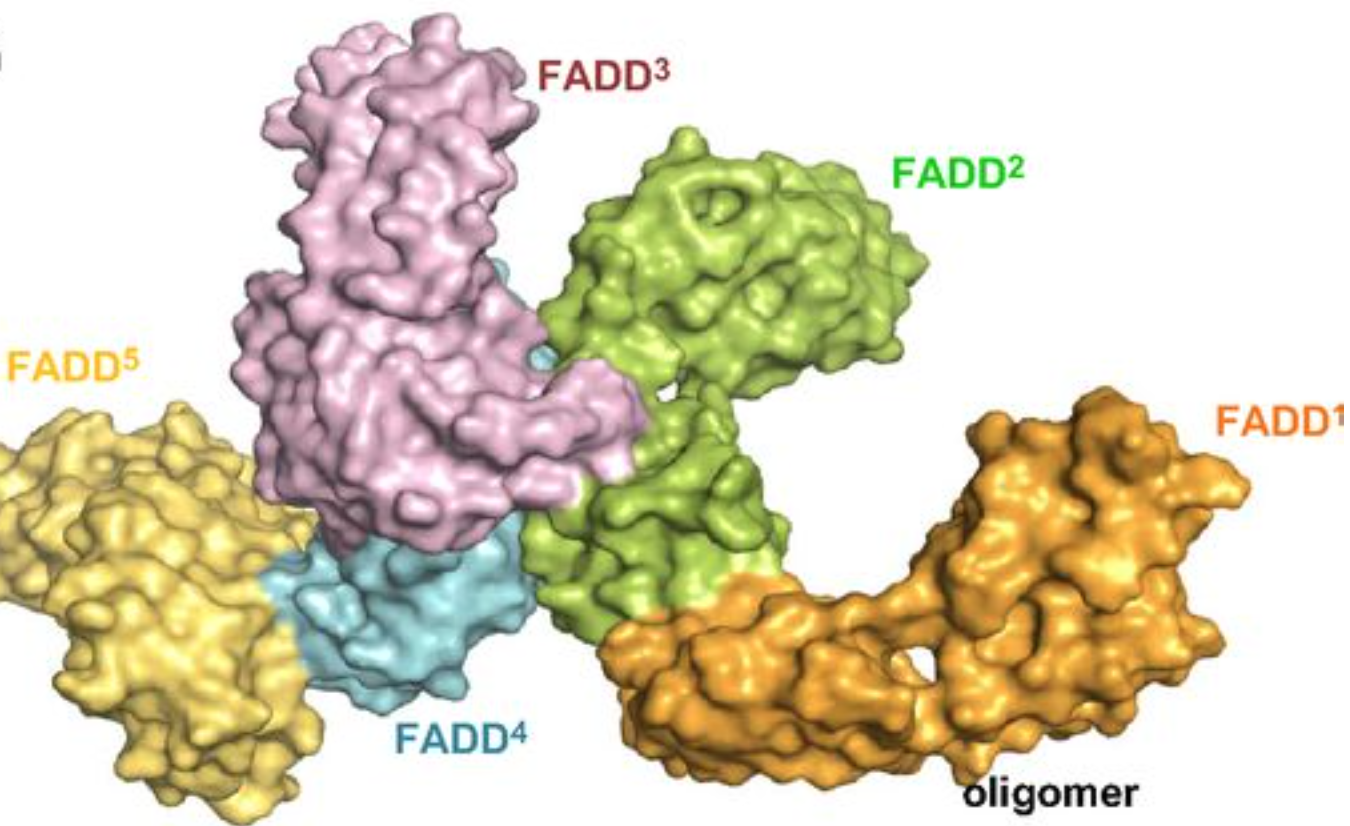
Molecular assembly of FADD forming DED chain-like structure. Each FADD molecule is shown in a different color.

These interactions are defined by helices α1/α4 and α2/α3: residues Ser1, Val6, His9, Leu43, Asp44 and Glu51 from α1/α4 are in contact with Thr21, Phe25, Lys33, Arg34, Glu37 and Glu51 from α2/α3 of the second molecule. Each interaction involves an area of 1062 Å^{2} and contributions from hydrophobic side chains, hydrogen bonding and salt bridges. The final homodimer has a structure oriented so that each subunit has the 2 interaction sites.

Procaspase-8, also a DED-containing protein, has affinity for the FADD DED. It's for that reason that they are recruited to FADD as monomers via their DEDs. These interaction is defined by α1/α4 of procapase-8 DED-A and FADD DED α2/α3 or α1/α4 of FADD DED and α2/α5 of procapase-8 DED-B. Procaspase-8 DED-B interacts with FADD and DED-A mediates capase-8 chain formation, or vice versa. However, in both cases the interaction leads to create a dimer between procaspases, which generates a conformational change. This dimerization is essential to create the active site; a p12 subunit is liberated and it is subsequently processed to the small p10 subunit. The two molecules of procapase-8 are associated with these p10 subunits creating an active protease-8 cell death.

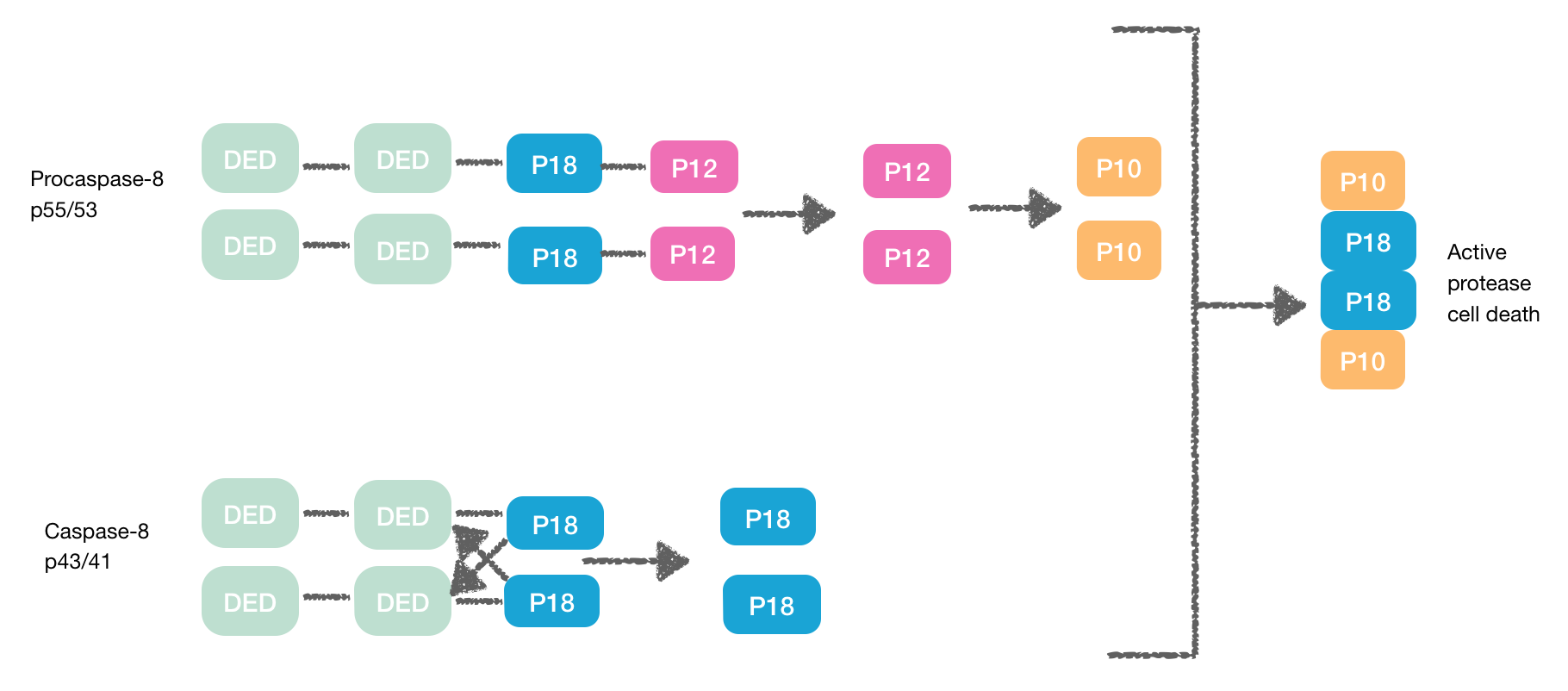
When two procaspase-8 are recruited to the DISC, their caspase domains undergo conformational changes with the consequent liberation of P12 subunit which is processed to the small P10 catalytic subunit. The intermediate capspase-8 breaks in the region between DED and P18 subunit. The two molecules of the two caspase-8 intermediates associate with the two P10 subunits to form the active protease.

=== Necroptosis ===
During the creation of the DISC procaspase-8 can also heterodimerise with another DED-containing protein known as FLIP_{L}. FLIP_{L}’s pseudo-caspase has two tandem DEDs that are very similar to the N-terminus of capase-8, but in which there is an important mutation in the active site (cysteine to tyrosine).

This heterodimeration done between their DEDs prevents from the normal homodimeration so that the pseudo-caspase is unable to activate the apoptotic cascade. FLIP_{L} ’s pseudo-caspase is more efficient at inducing the conformational change. However, FLIP_{L} hasn’t enough enzymatic activity so that cleavage between the DEDs and p18 it’s not possible. In consequence it’s impossible to create the active protease cell death.

Procaspase-8 can also heterodimerise with FLIP_{S}, also a DED containing protein. In this case heterodimerisation directly fails to activate procaspase-8 as the initial conformational change cannot take place in procaspase-8’s caspase domain.

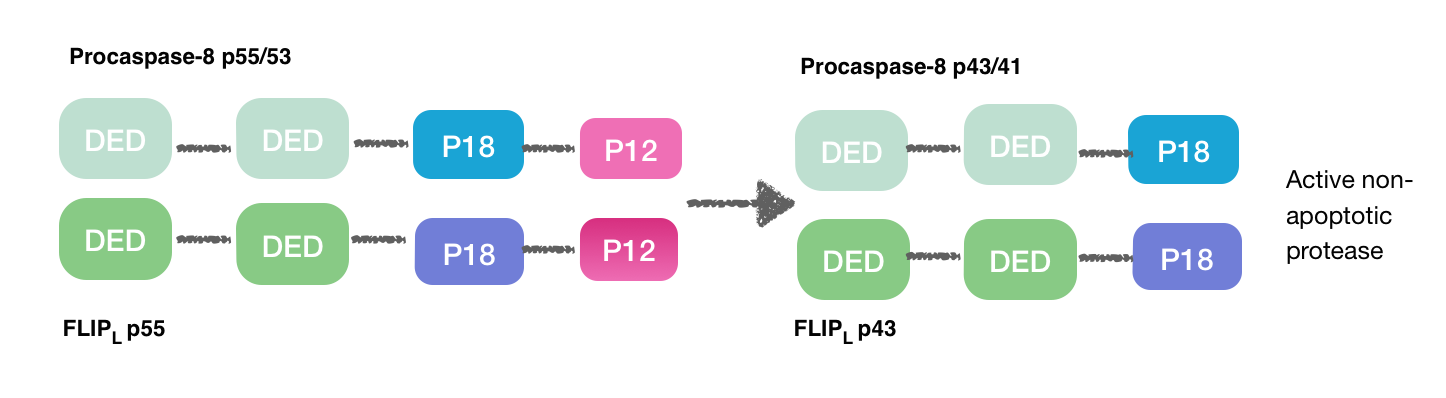
When FLIP is highly expressed, it creates an heterodimer with procaspase-8 at the DISC via interactions between their DEDs and those of FADD. The pseudo-caspase domain of FLIP_{L} is able to induce the conformational change in procaspase-8’s caspase domain that is necessary to create its active site. The heterodimer is processed between the p18 and p12 subunits of both proteins, but is unable to be further processed owing to FLIP_{L}’s lack of enzymatic activity, and this heterodimer is unable to activate apoptosis.

This is how DED can also inhibit the apoptosis cascade, and the consequence is necroptosis.

== The DED protein family ==
=== DED-containing proteins ===
==== Caspase-8 and caspase-10 ====
Caspases are cysteine proteases responsible for dismantling off the cell during apoptosis.

These proteins are zymogens and become active after their cleavage at specific sites within the molecule.

Structure:

- Death Effector Domain (DED) and a Caspase Recruitment Domain (CARD) that are englobed in a structure called pro-domain, which is located at the N-terminus
- Catalytic protease domain at the C-terminus.

There are two groups of proteases:

- Effector caspases: induce the biggest part of the morphological changes that occur during apoptosis.
- Initiator caspases: responsible for the activation of effector caspases. These caspases are activated through oligomerization and cleavage that make the protein functional.

The two tandem DEDs in the pro-domain of caspase induce the protein-protein interactions with other proteins like the FADD.

Studying caspases is important since they don’t only control apoptosis but also inhibit it, depending on the necessity of the cell. Scientists find that they are a mechanism that can regulate cell life and is important for cancer therapies.

==== FLICE-like inhibitory proteins (FLIPs) ====
FLICE-like inhibitory proteins (FLIPs) are cell inhibitors capable of stopping the death receptors’ signal, which cause cell apoptosis.

The first FLIPs that were identified were expressed by γ-herpes viruses so they were called v-FLIPs. These v-FLIPs were able to associate with the receptor in the death-inducing signaling complex (DISC), blocking that way the CD95-mediated apoptosis.

vFLIPs predominantly contain two sequential DEDs, which are highly homologous to the N-terminus of caspase-8.

The cellular homologues of v-FLIPs are generally expressed in two forms:

- c-FLIP_{S} (short): it contains only the amino-terminal tandem DEDs followed by a short carboxy-terminal section. Its structure is similar to the viral FLIPs.
- c-FLIP_{L} (long): it consists of not only the tandem DEDs, but also a protease-like domain (homologous to caspase-8) in which different important for protease activity amino acids are mutated, including the active site cysteine.

Both forms of c-FLIP are draft to the CD95 DISC, where they heterodimerize with caspase-8. c-FLIP has been involved in signaling alternative pathways, connecting the CD95 receptor to the NF-κB, JNK and MAPK pathways.

==== PEA-15/PED ====
PEA-15 (Phosphoprotein Enriched in Astrocytes-15 kDa) also known as PED (Phosphoprotein Enriched in Diabetes) is a DED-containing protein with pleiotropic effects.

PED is a small, non-catalytic, protein consisting of an N-terminal death-effector domain (DED) and a C-terminal tail with irregular structure. PED/PEA-15 interacts with various types of proteins with and without DEDs, and its specificity of joining these proteins is mediated by the phosphorylation on two serine residues on the C-terminal tail:

- Ser104: phosphorylated by protein kinase C (PKC).
- Ser116: the substrate for calcium/calmodulin-dependent protein kinase II (CamKII).

PEA-15 works as an antiapoptotic DED protein in several signaling cascades. In TNF α-, CD95- and TRAIL-mediated pathways, PEA-15 acts binding and disrupting FADD and caspase-8 interactions.

Besides apoptosis, PEA-15 inhibits the insulin-mediated glucose transport in muscle cells, so a high level expression of PEA-15's mRNA has been associated to diabetes mellitus type II.

==== DEDD/DEDD2 ====
Death effector domain containing DNA binding (DEDD). Shows DNA binding capacity, localized in the nucleoli in overexpression where it associates with a molecule called DEDAF (DED-associated factor) that potentiates apoptosis. In addition it blocks RNA polymerase I transcription by binding to the DNA.

DEDD2 (FLAME-3) is a DEDD homologue that shares a 48.5% of the amino acidic sequence. It is noted to interact with c-FLIP and DEDD and to have an important role in polymerase II-dependent transcription repression.

=== Proteins with a DED-related domain ===
==== HIP-1 and HIPPI ====
Huntingtin interacting protein-1 (HIP-1) is a protein that interacts with huntingtin (Htt), another protein that when is mutated (with expanded polyglutamine repeats) forms protein aggregates in the brain of patients with Huntington's disease (HD).

HIP-1 contains a pseudo death effector domain (pDED), that's why the overexpression of HIP-1 induces apoptosis in several cells as DED proteins do. This type of apoptosis depends on the pDED of the HIP-1, and it consists in the activation of caspase-3, an enzyme that is reduced when wild-type Htt is expressed, that fact suggests that HIP-1 cooperates with Htt in the pathomechanism of Huntington's disease.

By yeast two-hybrid screening, HIP-1 has shown to interact with a protein of 419 amino acids called HIPPI (HIP-1 protein interactor). Succeeding experiments have revealed that the presence of HIPPI determines the HIP-1-induced apoptosis.

==== FLASH ====
FLICE-associated huge protein. Contains a similar domain to DED, but the homology is very weak and its function is still unclear.

== Therapeutically exploiting DED ==
DED complexes have been shown to function at crucial steps controlling life and death cell processes. This knowledge is particularly useful in therapy because there are so many pathologies related with an abnormal control of the cell life.

The absence of apoptosis is feature of cancer. In some cases the gene encoding procaspase-8 is silenced by methylation, so it is necessary to activate the gene using epigenetic treatments to have active protease. In other cases there is an overexpression of FLIP, the anti-apoptotic molecule that prevents from the formation of the active caspase. In this case there are some anti-cancer agents that downregulate FLIP expression.

However, the abnormal apoptosis it is not exclusive from cancer, there are other pathologies such as inflammation and neurodegenerative diseases than can also be treated with these kind of therapeutics.
