= Fas receptor =

Protein found in humans

FAS
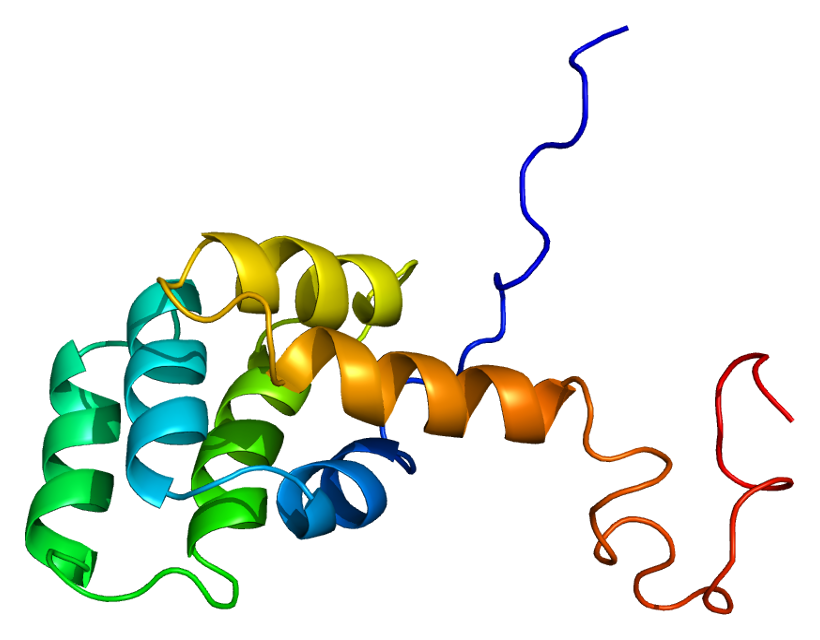

Identifiers
- Aliases: FAS, ALPS1A, APO-1, APT1, CD95, FAS1, FASTM, TNFRSF6, Fas cell surface death receptor
- External IDs: OMIM: 134637; MGI: 95484; GeneCards: FAS
Available structures
PDB	Ortholog search: PDBe RCSB
PDB	List of PDB id codes 1DDF, 3EWT, 3EZQ, 3THM, 3TJE, 2NA7

Gene location (Human)
Chr.	Chromosome 10 (human)
Band	10q23.31	Start	88,953,813 bp
Band	10q23.31	End	89,029,605 bp

Gene location (Mouse)
Chr.	Chromosome 19 (mouse)
Band	19 C1|19 29.48 cM	Start	34,290,666 bp
Band	19 C1|19 29.48 cM	End	34,327,772 bp
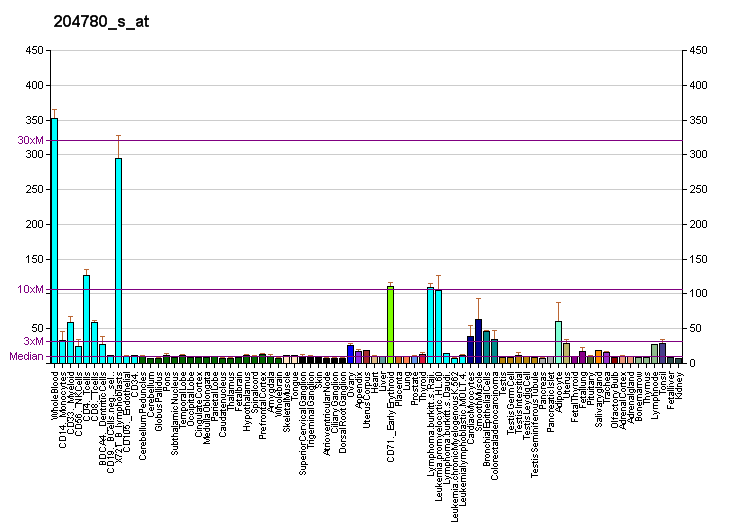

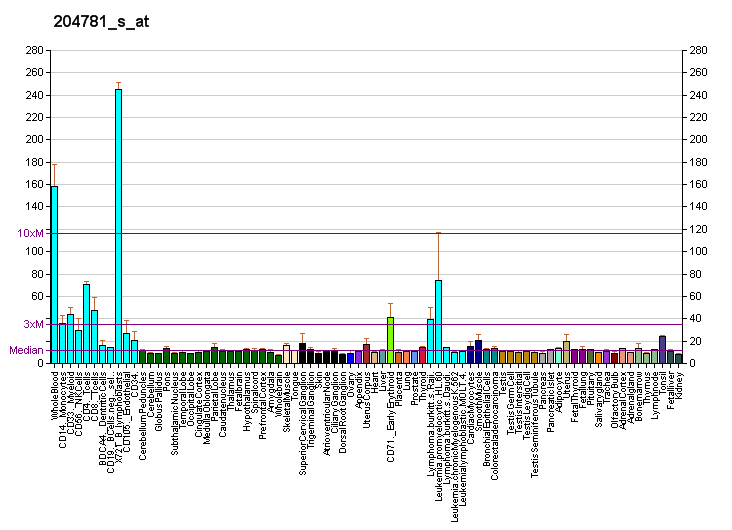

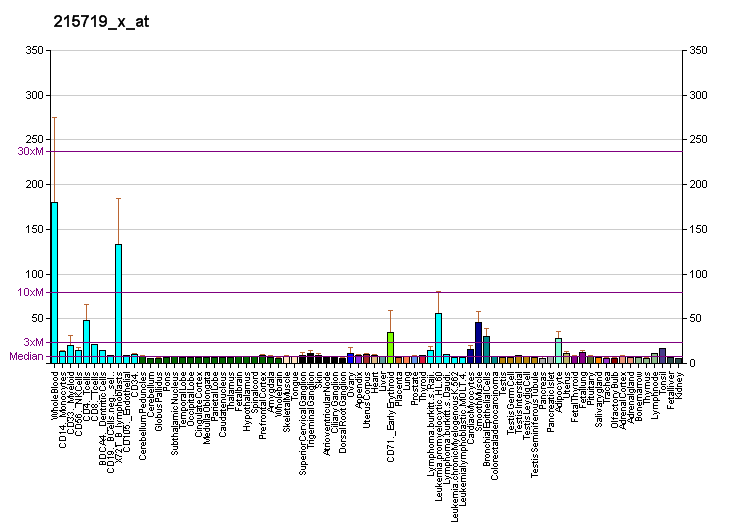
RNA expression pattern
Bgee	Human / Mouse (ortholog); Top expressed in: rectum; left ovary; right ovary; gallbladder; epithelium of nasopharynx; right lung; left adrenal gland; stromal cell of endometrium; right adrenal cortex; left adrenal cortex / Top expressed in: granulocyte; thymus; right lung lobe; tunica media of zone of aorta; seminal vesicula; intercostal muscle; duodenum; jejunum; brown adipose tissue; white adipose tissue; More reference expression data
BioGPS	More reference expression data
Gene ontology
Molecular function	kinase binding; protein binding; transmembrane signaling receptor activity; signal transducer activity; identical protein binding; tumor necrosis factor-activated receptor activity; tumor necrosis factor binding; calmodulin binding; signaling receptor activity
Cellular component	CD95 death-inducing signaling complex; membrane; extracellular region; cell surface; extracellular exosome; integral component of membrane; plasma membrane; integral component of plasma membrane; external side of plasma membrane; death-inducing signaling complex; membrane raft; cytosol; nuclear body; mitochondrion
Biological process	renal system process; activation-induced cell death of T cells; tumor necrosis factor-mediated signaling pathway; T cell homeostasis; positive regulation of extrinsic apoptotic signaling pathway in absence of ligand; cellular response to mechanical stimulus; circadian rhythm; apoptotic signaling pathway; positive regulation of extrinsic apoptotic signaling pathway; regulation of extrinsic apoptotic signaling pathway via death domain receptors; activation of cysteine-type endopeptidase activity involved in apoptotic process; apoptotic process; activation of cysteine-type endopeptidase activity involved in apoptotic signaling pathway; spleen development; negative thymic T cell selection; regulation of lymphocyte differentiation; necroptotic signaling pathway; motor neuron apoptotic process; inflammatory response; regulation of myeloid cell differentiation; protein homooligomerization; response to toxic substance; B cell mediated immunity; neuron apoptotic process; positive regulation of protein homooligomerization; cellular response to lithium ion; positive regulation of lymphocyte apoptotic process; negative regulation of apoptotic process; immune response; gene expression; cellular response to hyperoxia; negative regulation of B cell activation; response to glucocorticoid; extrinsic apoptotic signaling pathway in absence of ligand; inflammatory cell apoptotic process; immunoglobulin production; signal transduction; hepatocyte apoptotic process; response to lipopolysaccharide; extrinsic apoptotic signaling pathway; regulation of apoptotic process; positive regulation of apoptotic process; regulation of cell population proliferation; negative regulation of extrinsic apoptotic signaling pathway via death domain receptors; multicellular organism development; extrinsic apoptotic signaling pathway via death domain receptors; positive regulation of protein phosphorylation; regulation of stress-activated MAPK cascade; cellular response to amino acid starvation; Fas signaling pathway; positive regulation of apoptotic signaling pathway; positive regulation of cysteine-type endopeptidase activity involved in apoptotic signaling pathway; protein-containing complex assembly
Sources:Amigo / QuickGO
Orthologs
Databases	NCBI: entry; OMA: entry
Species	Human	Mouse
Entrez	355	14102
Ensembl	ENSG00000026103	ENSMUSG00000024778
UniProt	P25445	P25446
RefSeq (mRNA)	NM_000043; NM_152871; NM_152872; NM_152873; NM_152874 NM_152875; NM_152876; NM_152877; NM_001320619	NM_001146708; NM_007987
RefSeq (protein)	NP_000034; NP_001307548; NP_690610; NP_690611	NP_001140180; NP_032013
Location (UCSC)	Chr 10: 88.95 – 89.03 Mb	Chr 19: 34.29 – 34.33 Mb
PubMed search
- Wikidata
View/Edit Human	View/Edit Mouse

The Fas receptor, also known as Fas, FasR, apoptosis antigen 1 (APO-1 or APT), cluster of differentiation 95 (CD95) or tumor necrosis factor receptor superfamily member 6 (TNFRSF6), is a protein that in humans is encoded by the FAS gene. Fas was first identified using a monoclonal antibody generated by immunizing mice with the FS-7 cell line. Thus, the name Fas is derived from FS-7-associated surface antigen.

The Fas receptor is a death receptor on the surface of cells that leads to programmed cell death (apoptosis) if it binds its ligand, Fas ligand (FasL). It is one of two apoptosis pathways, the other being the mitochondrial pathway.

== Gene ==
FAS receptor gene is located on the long arm of chromosome 10 (10q24.1) in humans and on chromosome 19 in mice. The gene lies on the plus (Watson strand) and is 25,255 bases in length organized into nine protein encoding exons. Similar sequences related by evolution (orthologs) are found in most mammals.

== Protein ==
Previous reports have identified as many as eight splice variants, which are translated into seven isoforms of the protein. Apoptosis-inducing Fas receptor is dubbed isoform 1 and is a type 1 transmembrane protein. Many of the other isoforms are rare haplotypes that are usually associated with a state of disease. However, two isoforms, the apoptosis-inducing membrane-bound form and the soluble form, are normal products whose production via alternative splicing is regulated by the cytotoxic RNA binding protein TIA1.

The mature Fas protein has 319 amino acids, has a predicted molecular weight of 48 kilodaltons and is divided into three domains: an extracellular domain, a transmembrane domain, and a cytoplasmic domain. The extracellular domain has 157 amino acids and is rich in cysteine residues. The transmembrane and cytoplasmic domains have 17 and 145 amino acids respectively. Exons 1 through 5 encode the extracellular region. Exon 6 encodes the transmembrane region. Exons 7-9 encode the intracellular region.

== Function ==
Fas forms the death-inducing signaling complex (DISC) upon ligand binding. Membrane-anchored Fas ligand trimer on the surface of an adjacent cell causes oligomerization of Fas. Recent studies which suggested the trimerization of Fas could not be validated. Other models suggested the oligomerization up to 5–7 Fas molecules in the DISC. This event is also mimicked by binding of an agonistic Fas antibody, though some evidence suggests that the apoptotic signal induced by the antibody is unreliable in the study of Fas signaling. To this end, several clever ways of trimerizing the antibody for in vitro research have been employed.

Upon ensuing death domain (DD) aggregation, the receptor complex is internalized via the cellular endosomal machinery. This allows the adaptor molecule FADD to bind the death domain of Fas through its own death domain.

FADD also contains a death effector domain (DED) near its amino terminus, which facilitates binding to the DED of FADD-like interleukin-1 beta-converting enzyme (FLICE), more commonly referred to as caspase-8. FLICE can then self-activate through proteolytic cleavage into p10 and p18 subunits, two each of which form the active heterotetramer enzyme. Active caspase-8 is then released from the DISC into the cytosol, where it cleaves other effector caspases, eventually leading to DNA degradation, membrane blebbing, and other hallmarks of apoptosis.

Recently, Fas has also been shown to promote tumor growth, since during tumor progression, it is frequently downregulated or cells are rendered apoptosis resistant. Cancer cells in general, regardless of their Fas apoptosis sensitivity, depend on constitutive activity of Fas. This is stimulated by cancer-produced Fas ligand for optimal growth.

Although Fas has been shown to promote tumor growth in the above mouse models, analysis of the human cancer genomics database revealed that FAS is not significantly focally amplified across a dataset of 3131 tumors (FAS is not an oncogene), but is significantly focally deleted across the entire dataset of these 3131 tumors, suggesting that FAS functions as a tumor suppressor in humans.

In cultured cells, FasL induces various types of cancer cell apoptosis through the Fas receptor. In AOM-DSS-induced colon carcinoma and MCA-induced sarcoma mouse models, it has been shown that Fas acts as a tumor suppressor. Furthermore, the Fas receptor also mediates tumor-specific cytotoxic T lymphocyte (CTL) anti-tumor cytotoxicity. In addition to the well-described on-target CTL anti-tumor cytotoxicity, Fas has been ascribed with a distinct function – the induction of bystander tumor cell death even amongst cognate antigen non-expressing (bystander) cells. CTL-mediated bystander killing was described by the Fleischer Lab in 1986 and later attributed to fas-mediated lysis in vitro by the Austin Research Institute, Cellular Cytotoxicity Laboratory. More recently, fas-mediated bystander tumor cell killing was demonstrated in vivo by the Lymphoma Immunotherapy Program at Mount Sinai School of Medicine using T cells and CAR-T cells, similar to additional in vitro work using bispecific antibodies performed at Amgen.

== Role in apoptosis ==
Some reports have suggested that the extrinsic Fas pathway is sufficient to induce complete apoptosis in certain cell types through DISC assembly and subsequent caspase-8 activation. These cells are dubbed Type 1 cells and are characterized by the inability of anti-apoptotic members of the Bcl-2 family (namely Bcl-2 and Bcl-xL) to protect from Fas-mediated apoptosis. Characterized Type 1 cells include H9, CH1, SKW6.4 and SW480, all of which are lymphocyte lineages except the latter, which is a colon adenocarcinoma lineage. However, evidence for crosstalk between the extrinsic and intrinsic pathways exists in the Fas signal cascade.

In most cell types, caspase-8 catalyzes the cleavage of the pro-apoptotic BH3-only protein Bid into its truncated form, tBid. BH-3 only members of the Bcl-2 family exclusively engage anti-apoptotic members of the family (Bcl-2, Bcl-xL), allowing Bak and Bax to translocate to the outer mitochondrial membrane, thus permeabilizing it and facilitating release of pro-apoptotic proteins such as cytochrome c and Smac/DIABLO, an antagonist of inhibitors of apoptosis proteins (IAPs).

Overview of signal transduction pathways involved in apoptosis.

== Interactions ==
Fas receptor has been shown to interact with:

- Caspase 8,
- Caspase 10,
- CFLAR,
- FADD,
- Fas ligand,
- PDCD6, and
- Small ubiquitin-related modifier 1.
