= TNF receptor superfamily =

Protein superfamily of cytokine receptors

TNFR/NGFR cysteine-rich region
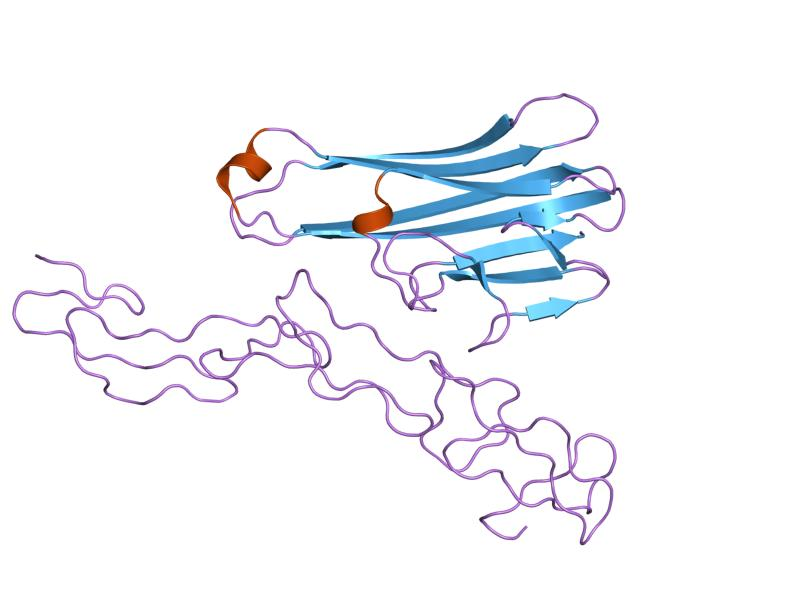
- Structure of the soluble human 55 kd TNF receptor-human TNF beta complex.

Identifiers
- Symbol: TNFR_c6
- Pfam: PF00020
- Pfam clan: CL0607
- ECOD: 389.1.3
- InterPro: IPR011614
- PROSITE: PDOC00561
- SCOP2: 1tnr / SCOPe / SUPFAM
- Membranome: 6
Available protein structures:
- PDB: IPR011614 PF00020 (ECOD; PDBsum)
- AlphaFold: IPR011614; PF00020

The tumor necrosis factor receptor superfamily (TNFRSF) is a protein superfamily of cytokine receptors characterized by the ability to bind tumor necrosis factors (TNFs) via an extracellular cysteine-rich domain. With the exception of nerve growth factor (NGF), all TNFs are homologous to the archetypal TNF-alpha. In their active form, the majority of TNF receptors form trimeric complexes in the plasma membrane. Accordingly, most TNF receptors contain transmembrane domains (TMDs), although some can be cleaved into soluble forms (e.g. TNFR1), and some lack a TMD entirely (e.g. DcR3). In addition, most TNF receptors require specific adaptor protein such as TRADD, TRAF, RIP and FADD for downstream signalling. TNF receptors are primarily involved in apoptosis and inflammation, but they can also take part in other signal transduction pathways, such as proliferation, survival, and differentiation. TNF receptors are expressed in a wide variety of tissues in mammals, especially in leukocytes.

The term death receptor refers to those members of the TNF receptor superfamily that contain a death domain, such as TNFR1, Fas receptor, DR4 and DR5. They were named after the fact that they seemed to play an important role in apoptosis (programmed cell death), although they are now known to play other roles as well.

In the strict sense, the term TNF receptor is often used to refer to the archetypal members of the superfamily, namely TNFR1 and TNFR2, which recognize TNF-alpha.

== Members ==
In humans, there are 29 known family members of the TNF receptor superfamily. Historically, the family members have been numerically classified as TNFRSF#, where # denotes the member number, sometimes followed a letter. Some newer additions to the TNF family remain unnumbered, however, such as the TNF receptor superfamily member EDAR.

Type	Protein (member #)	Synonyms	Gene	Ligand(s)
1	Tumor necrosis factor receptor 1 (1A)	CD120a	TNFRSF1A	TNF (cachectin)
1	Tumor necrosis factor receptor 2 (1B)	CD120b	TNFRSF1B	TNF (cachectin)
3	Lymphotoxin beta receptor (3)	CD18	LTBR	Lymphotoxin beta (TNF-C)
4	OX40 (4)	CD134	TNFRSF4	OX40L
5	CD40 (5)	Bp50	CD40	CD154
6	Fas receptor (6)	Apo-1, CD95	FAS	FasL
6	Decoy receptor 3 (6B)	TR6, M68	TNFRSF6B	FasL, LIGHT, TL1A
7	CD27 (7)	S152, Tp55	CD27	CD70, Siva
8	CD30 (8)	Ki-1, TNR8	TNFRSF8	CD153
9	4-1BB (9)	CD137	TNFRSF9	4-1BB ligand
10	Death receptor 4 (10A)	TRAILR1, Apo-2, CD261	TNFRSF10A	TRAIL
10	Death receptor 5 (10B)	TRAILR2, CD262	TNFRSF10B	TRAIL
10	Decoy receptor 1 (10C)	TRAILR3, LIT, TRID, CD263	TNFRSF10C	TRAIL
10	Decoy receptor 2 (10D)	TRAILR4, TRUNDD, CD264	TNFRSF10D	TRAIL
11	RANK (11A)	CD265	TNFRSF11A	RANKL
11	Osteoprotegerin (11B)	OCIF, TR1	TNFRSF11B	RANKL
12	TWEAK receptor (12A)	Fn14, CD266	TNFRSF12A	TWEAK
13	TACI (13B)	IGAD2, CD267	TNFRSF13B	APRIL, BAFF, CAMLG
13	BAFF receptor (13C)	CD268	TNFRSF13C	BAFF
14	Herpesvirus entry mediator (14)	ATAR, TR2, CD270	TNFRSF14	LIGHT
16	Nerve growth factor receptor (16)	p75NTR, CD271	NGFR	NGF, BDNF, NT-3, NT-4
17	B-cell maturation antigen (17)	TNFRSF13A, CD269, BCMA	TNFRSF17	BAFF
18	Glucocorticoid-induced TNFR-related (18)	AITR, CD357	TNFRSF18	GITR ligand
19	TROY (19)	TAJ, TRADE	TNFRSF19	unknown
19L	RELT (19L)	FLJ14993	RELT	unknown
21	Death receptor 6 (21)	CD358	TNFRSF21	unknown
25	Death receptor 3 (25)	Apo-3, TRAMP, LARD, WS-1	TNFRSF25	TL1A
27	Ectodysplasin A2 receptor (27)	XEDAR	EDA2R	EDA-A2
EDAR	Ectodysplasin A receptor (EDAR)	Downless Homolog	EDAR	EDA-A1
