= Sinodonty and Sundadonty =

Patterns of dentitions in East Asia

In anthropology, Sinodonty and Sundadonty are two patterns of features widely found in the dentitions of the populations of East Asia and Southeast Asia respectively. These two patterns were identified by anthropologist Christy G. Turner II as being within the greater "Mongoloid dental complex".

The combining forms Sino- and Sunda- refer to China and Sundaland, respectively, while -dont refers to teeth.

== Proto-sundadonty hypothesis ==
Tsunehiko Hanihara (1993) believed that the dental features of Aboriginal Australians have the characteristic of high frequencies of "evolutionarily conservative characteristics," which he called the "proto-sundadont" pattern, as he believed that the dental pattern of Aboriginal Australians was ancestral to that of Southeast Asians.

C.G Turner II, in his 2016 analysis, that sundadonty is the proto-East Eurasian dental morphology and is not connected to the Australian dental morphology, rendering the term "proto-sundadont" inaccurate for the Australian dental morphology. He also shows that sinodonty is predominant in Native Americans.

== Super-Sinodont ==
Analysis on the Sinodonty and Sundadonty of New world groups by G.R. Sott et al. (2016) shows the distinction among East Asians is not nearly as dramatic as the difference between all Asians and all New World groups. Other researchers, such a Stojanowski et al., 2013; Stojanowski and Johnson, (2015) suggest New World groups may be neither Sinodont nor Sundadont and in most regards, could be viewed as super-Sinodont. A clear dental morphology not only ties New World groups to Asians, particularly northeast Asians, but it also exhibits a pattern largely consistent with the Beringian Standstill model (BSM) based on a Sinodont source population.

== Mongoloid dental complex ==
Turner defined the Sinodont and Sundadont dental complexes in contrast to a broader Mongoloid dental complex. Hanihara defined the Mongoloid dental complex in 1966. In 1984, Turner separated the Mongoloid dental complex into the Sinodont and Sundadont dental complexes.

Ryuta Hamada, Shintaro Kondo and Eizo Wakatsuki (1997) said, on the basis of dental traits, that Mongoloids are separated into sinodonts and sundadonts, which is supported by Christy G. Turner II (1989).

=== Sundadont ===
Turner found the Sundadont pattern in the skeletal remains of Jōmon people of Japan, and in living populations of Taiwanese indigenous peoples, Filipinos, Indonesians, Borneans, and Malays.

In 1996, Rebecca Haydenblit of the Hominid Evolutionary Biology Research Group at Cambridge University did a study on the dentition of four Pre-Columbian era Mesoamerican populations and compared their data to other Eastern Eurasian populations. She found that "Tlatilco", "Cuicuilco", "Monte Albán" and "Cholula" populations followed an overall Sundadont dental pattern "characteristic of Southeast Asia" rather than a Sinodont dental pattern "characteristic of Northeast Asia".

According to a 2016 study, Sundadonty is characterized by an early generalized pattern with simple crown and root traits.

=== Sinodont ===
Turner found the Sinodont pattern in the Han Chinese, in the inhabitants of Mongolia and eastern Siberia, in the Native Americans, and in the Yayoi people of Japan.

Sinodonty is a particular pattern of teeth characterized by the following features:

- The upper first incisors and upper second incisors are shovel-shaped, and they are "not aligned with the other teeth".
- The upper first premolar has one root, and the lower first molar in Sinodonts has three roots (3RM1).

==== Associated traits ====
The EDAR gene causes the Sinodont tooth pattern, and also affects hair texture, jaw morphology, and perhaps the nutritional profile of breast milk.

== Applicability ==
In the 1990s, Turner's dental morphological traits were frequently mentioned as one of three new tools for studying origins and migrations of human populations. The other two were linguistic methods such as Joseph Greenberg's mass comparison of vocabulary or Johanna Nichols's statistical study of language typology and its evolution, and genetic studies pioneered by Cavalli-Sforza.

Today, the largest number of references to Turner's work are from discussions of the origin of Paleo-Amerindians and modern Native Americans, including the Kennewick Man controversy. Turner found that the dental remains of both ancient and modern Amerindians are more similar to each other than they are to dental complexes from other continents, but that the Sinodont patterns of the Paleo-Amerindians identify their ancestral homeland as north-east Asia. Some later studies have questioned this and found Sundadont features in some American peoples.

A study done by Stojonowski et al in 2015 found a "significant interobserver error" in the earlier studies and their statistical analysis of matched wear and morphology scores suggests trait downgrading for some traits.

== See also ==
- Ainu people
- Austronesian peoples
- Malay race
- Mongoloid
- Odontometrics
- Shovel-shaped incisors
