= Odontometrics =

Measurement and study of tooth size

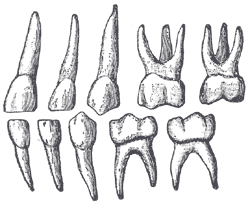

Odontometrics is the measurement and study of tooth size. It is used in biological anthropology and bioarchaeology to study human phenotypic variation. The rationale for use is similar to that of the study of dentition, the structure and arrangement of teeth. There are a number of features that can be observed in human teeth through the use of odontometrics.

The length and width of teeth are measured from front to back and side to side using calipers. These measurements can be made directly from skeletal material or through dental casts of living humans. The measurements that are reported most commonly are maximum crown length and maximum crown breadth.

== Uses of odontometrics ==
=== Determining age ===
Linking to the Past by Kenneth L. Feder states that "Dental development...provides a valuable gauge of the level of physical maturity and age." The first set of teeth, or the lower central incisors, does not begin to appear until the infant is approximately six-and-a-half months old. The rest of the baby teeth, which are called deciduous teeth, will then appear “fairly consistently across the species”, until the child is about two-years-old, when the second upper molars appear; at this point in development, there are twenty teeth in all.

From the age of two-and-a-half until about six years, the deciduous teeth maintain stability, until a set of molars (also called “Six Year Molars”) appear in the lower jaw; these are the child’s first permanent teeth. From this point on, for the approximate next twelve years, the rest of the deciduous teeth will be replaced by all of the permanent teeth. Additional permanent teeth will erupt in the back of the mouth in order to enlarge the mouth. When the process of all permanent teeth coming in is over, the adult mouth will have thirty-two teeth.

The “fairly consistent” rate at which deciduous and permanent teeth appear is relevant because it allows an expert to determine the age of the human. According to Feder, based on odontometrics, “the approximate age of a living child or the age at which a deceased child died can be fairly easily and accurately determined based on which teeth are present, the stage of growth of these teeth, and which teeth have yet to erupt into the mouth.”

=== Determining sex ===
Though, when available, more standard approaches to sex identification are used, in times where the archaeological remains are not completely discovered or preserved, odontometrics are used. Because teeth are “made from the most enduring mineralized tissues in the human body”, they are resistant to many types of destruction, including physical, thermal, mechanical and chemical. According to Marin Vodanović et al., “Sex determination using dental features is primarily based upon the comparison of tooth dimensions in males and females, or upon the comparison of frequencies of non-metric dental traits, like Carabelli's trait of upper molars, deflecting wrinkle of lower first molars, distal accessory ridge of the upper and lower canines or shoveling of the upper central incisors”. When analyzing the teeth, one must also take into consideration the differences in odontometric features between different populations, or one may be led to a false conclusion in sex determination.

Several studies have established that on average males have larger teeth than females, although the differences are small and not always statistically significant. The most sexually dimorphic human teeth are the canines, with other teeth showing smaller size differences. Recent research looking at the dental tissues within the tooth crown indicate that male teeth have significantly greater quantities of dentine than females, both absolutely and proportionally, and such differences could be useful in estimating sex.

=== Determining population ===
Certain features observed in human teeth can link them to different populations. Teeth exhibit variables with a strong hereditary component that are useful in assessing population relationships and evolutionary dynamics. One example is shovel-shaped incisors, in which individuals have ridges on the inside margins of their front teeth. This trait is most common in East Asian and Native American populations and occurs less frequently elsewhere. Teeth have an important role in chewing food, and different dental pathologies and patterns of tooth wear can indicate kinds of food eaten and other dietary behaviors of certain populations. The measurement and examination of teeth can also exhibit incidental and intentional modifications which reflect the patterns of different cultural behaviors. The process of tooth formation is highly reflective of environment. Developmental defects observed on teeth can provide a general measure of environmental stress on a population.

== Odontometrics and human evolution ==
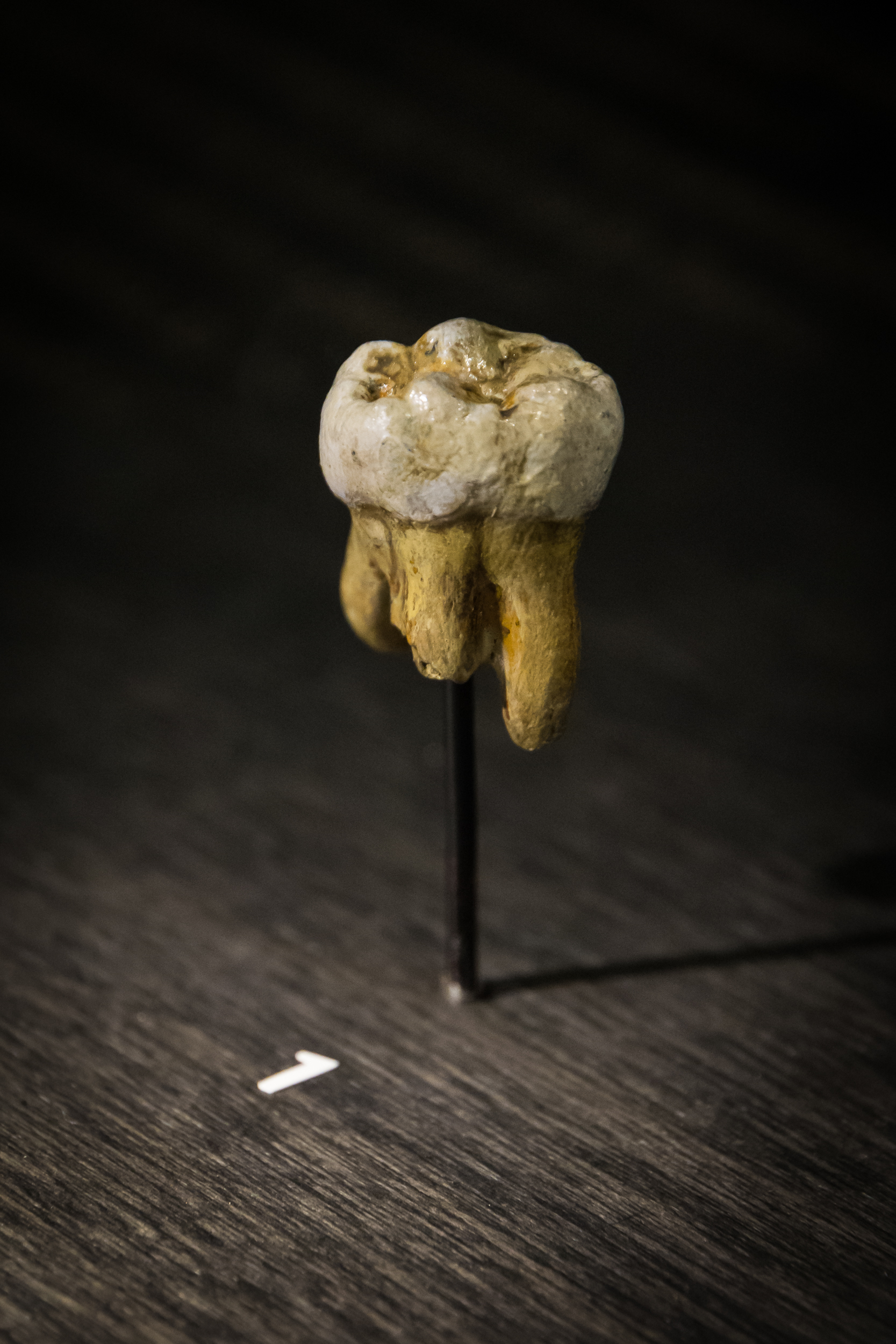

The study of human variation through odontometrics provides information about the past. Measurements of the teeth and jaws of modern humans are smaller than that of their hominin ancestors. However, examinations of fossil evidence have shown a decrease in the size of the masticatory system that can be mostly attributed to the changes in the dietary habits of the species. Canine teeth are believed to be small in the earliest hominins and the reduction of size continues during the early period. In Modern humans, the first molar teeth are the largest among the molars and the overall tooth size is reduced. In the earliest hominins and archaic hominins, second molars were generally the largest of the molars teeth and the third molars were closer to the size of the second molars. The evolution of human tooth size and the masticatory system are not only related to diet and food processing techniques, they are also related to brain size, bipedalism and speech.

=== Homo habilis ===
Between 1.9 million and 1.44 million years ago. The teeth of Homo habilis are generally smaller than those of most australopiths, but are still somewhat larger than those of most living humans.

=== Homo erectus ===
Arose 1.9 million years ago. The jaws and teeth of Homo erectus are still large compared to those of modern humans but smaller than those of earlier hominins, particularly the back teeth. Microscopic analyses of the teeth show wear patterns characteristic of extensive meat eating.

=== Homo heidelbergensis ===
Between 800,000 and 200,000 years ago. Teeth of Homo heidelbergensis were arranged in the jaw so that they formed a parabolic shape (curved at the front). The teeth were also smaller than those of earlier species but still larger than those of modern humans. Some members of this species possessed a gap called a retromolar space, behind the wisdom teeth at the back of the jaw.

=== Homo neanderthalensis ===
Between 130,000 and 28,000 years ago. The Neanderthal face acted to withstand stresses brought about by the use of their relatively large front teeth. The front teeth of Neanderthals are large relative to their back teeth and often show considerable wear, suggesting that they were used as tools.

== Applying odontometrics ==
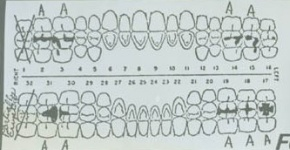

=== Forensic investigations ===
Odontometric studies are also utilized for age and sex determination in forensic investigations. They are often used in the forensic cases along with craniofacial morphology. Teeth are good sources of material for civil and medicolegal identification because they provide resistance to damage in terms of bacterial decomposition and fire when the rest of the body is damaged beyond recognition. Odontometrics play an important role in the determination of sex in young individuals when secondary sexual characteristics have not yet developed.

=== Mass disasters ===
When a mass disaster occurs, either natural or man-made, odontology can be used to help identify victims. Some natural disasters include tornadoes, hurricanes, wildfires and floods. Man-made disasters can be either intentional or unintentional and include transportation accidents, chemical spills and explosions. Once a mass fatality occurs, forensic odontologists are called in to conduct dental autopsies on remains and compare ante and post mortem dental records.

=== Case studies ===
Odontology has been used in many historical cases of identification in crimes and mass disasters.

1952- In Doyle V. Texas, Doyle was convicted of burglary based on a bite mark left on a block of cheese found at the crime scene. This was the first U.S case to result in a conviction based on bite mark analysis.

Other famous cases using odontometrics include:

- Ted Bundy
- John Wilkes Booth
- John Wayne Gacy
- Hurricane Katrina
- September 11th Terrorist Attacks

== See also ==
- Shovel-shaped incisors
- Sinodonty and Sundadonty
