= DR3 (disambiguation) =

DR3 may refer to:

- Death receptor 3, a protein
- DR-3, a highway in the Dominican Republic
- DR3 register, a debug register of x86 processors
- DR3 (car), an Italian automobile by DR Motor Company
- DR3, a Danish online television channel from DR and former television channel
- Dead Rising 3, a video game for the Xbox One console
- Danganronpa 3: The End of Hope's Peak High School, an anime series in the Danganronpa franchise
- Daniel Ricciardo, Formula One driver using racing number 3
- DR3 (DR for "Dreieckrechner"), a German flight computer manufactured as of 1943
- DR3: Gaia Data Release 3
