= Winging =

Winging may refer to:

- Scapula winging, a condition in which the medial border of a person's scapula is abnormally positioned outward and backward
- Winging, a type of Aerodynamic Flight by which an object moves either through the air by using surfaces to produce lift
- Shovel-shaped incisors, a particular orientation of human teeth
- Wing foiling, a wind powered water sport

== Or see ==
- wikt:whinging
