= RELT =

Protein-coding gene in the species Homo sapiens

Identifiers
- Aliases: RELT, TNFRSF19L, TRLT, RELT tumor necrosis factor receptor, TNF receptor, RELT TNF receptor, AI3C
- External IDs: OMIM: 611211; MGI: 2443373; GeneCards: RELT

Gene location (Human)
Chr.	Chromosome 11 (human)
Band	11q13.4	Start	73,376,399 bp
Band	11q13.4	End	73,397,474 bp

Gene location (Mouse)
Chr.	Chromosome 7 (mouse)
Band	7|7 E2	Start	100,495,054 bp
Band	7|7 E2	End	100,512,653 bp
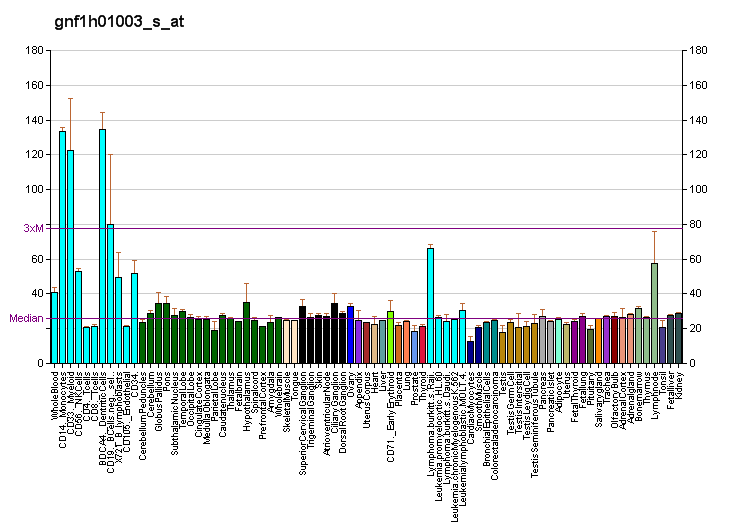

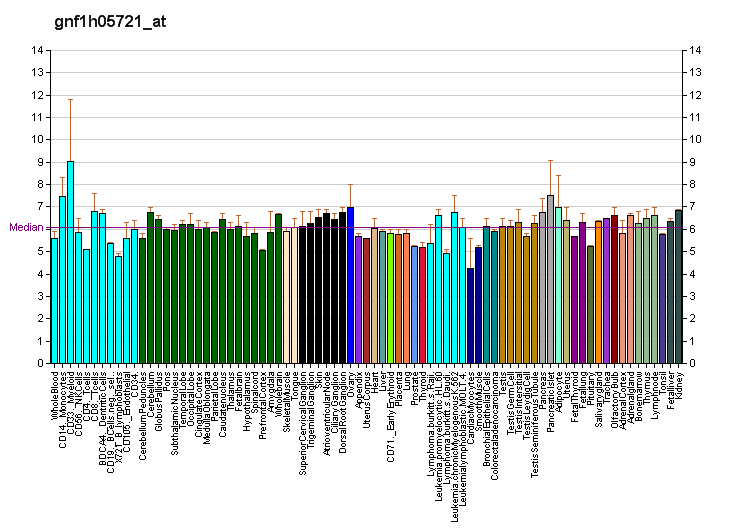
RNA expression pattern
Bgee	Human / Mouse (ortholog); Top expressed in: monocyte; granulocyte; blood; bone marrow cell; spleen; gastrocnemius muscle; muscle of thigh; appendix; lymph node; upper lobe of left lung / Top expressed in: granulocyte; bone marrow; quadriceps femoris muscle; spleen; muscle tissue; skeletal muscle tissue; islet of Langerhans; hypothalamus; female urethra; placenta; More reference expression data
BioGPS	More reference expression data
Gene ontology
Molecular function	tumor necrosis factor-activated receptor activity; protein binding
Cellular component	cytoplasm; integral component of membrane; plasma membrane; integral component of plasma membrane; membrane; nucleus; perinuclear region of cytoplasm
Biological process	multicellular organism development; regulation of apoptotic process; apoptotic signaling pathway; response to lipopolysaccharide; inflammatory response; regulation of cell population proliferation; immune response; tumor necrosis factor-mediated signaling pathway; apoptotic process
Sources:Amigo / QuickGO
Orthologs
Databases	NCBI: entry; OMA: entry
Species	Human	Mouse
Entrez	84957	320100
Ensembl	ENSG00000054967	ENSMUSG00000008318
UniProt	Q969Z4	Q8BX43
RefSeq (mRNA)	NM_032871; NM_152222	NM_177073; NM_001358914
RefSeq (protein)	NP_116260; NP_689408	NP_796047; NP_001345843
Location (UCSC)	Chr 11: 73.38 – 73.4 Mb	Chr 7: 100.5 – 100.51 Mb
PubMed search
- Wikidata
View/Edit Human	View/Edit Mouse

Tumor necrosis factor receptor superfamily member 19L is a protein that in humans is encoded by the RELT gene.

== Function ==
The protein encoded by this gene is a member of the TNF-receptor superfamily. This receptor is especially abundant in hematologic tissues. It has been shown to activate the NF-kappaB pathway and selectively bind TNF receptor-associated factor 1 (TRAF1). This receptor is capable of stimulating T-cell proliferation in the presence of CD3 signaling, which suggests its regulatory role in immune response. Two alternatively spliced transcript variants of this gene encoding the same protein have been reported.
