= CD27 =

Protein in the tumor necrosis factor receptor superfamily

Identifiers
- Aliases: CD27, S152, S152. LPFS2, T14, TNFRSF7, Tp55, CD27 molecule
- External IDs: OMIM: 186711; MGI: 88326; GeneCards: CD27

Gene location (Human)
Chr.	Chromosome 12 (human)
Band	12p13.31	Start	6,444,955 bp
Band	12p13.31	End	6,451,718 bp

Gene location (Mouse)
Chr.	Chromosome 6 (mouse)
Band	6 F3|6 59.32 cM	Start	125,209,585 bp
Band	6 F3|6 59.32 cM	End	125,213,973 bp
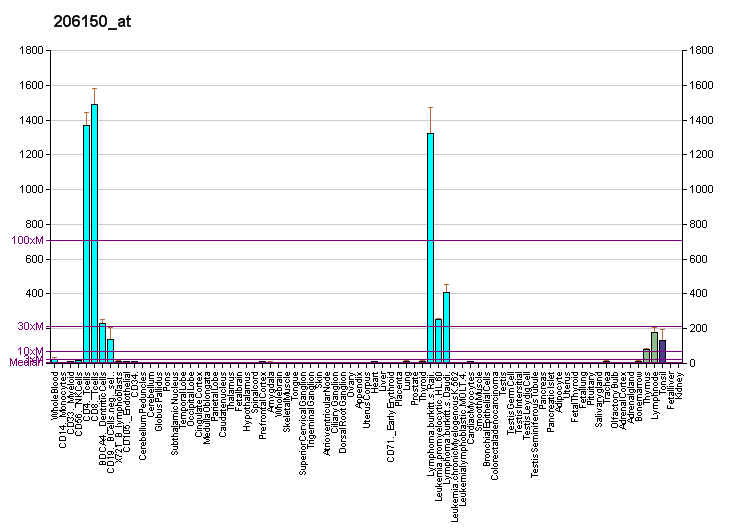
RNA expression pattern
Bgee	Human / Mouse (ortholog); Top expressed in: lymph node; spleen; appendix; bone marrow cell; granulocyte; blood; duodenum; testicle; mucosa of transverse colon; tonsil / Top expressed in: thymus; spleen; epithelium of small intestine; intestinal villus; Ileal epithelium; pharynx; granulocyte; bone marrow; spermatid; neck; More reference expression data
BioGPS	More reference expression data
Gene ontology
Molecular function	tumor necrosis factor-activated receptor activity; cysteine-type endopeptidase inhibitor activity involved in apoptotic process; protein binding; transmembrane signaling receptor activity
Cellular component	extracellular region; integral component of membrane; integral component of plasma membrane; membrane; cell surface; plasma membrane; external side of plasma membrane
Biological process	negative regulation of apoptotic process; response to lipopolysaccharide; response to ethanol; negative regulation of T cell apoptotic process; extrinsic apoptotic signaling pathway; regulation of cell population proliferation; cell surface receptor signaling pathway; apoptotic process; tumor necrosis factor-mediated signaling pathway; immunoglobulin mediated immune response; positive regulation of JNK cascade; inflammatory response; immune response; negative regulation of cysteine-type endopeptidase activity involved in apoptotic process; positive regulation of B cell differentiation; positive regulation of T cell differentiation; multicellular organism development; positive regulation of NIK/NF-kappaB signaling
Sources:Amigo / QuickGO
Orthologs
Databases	NCBI: entry; OMA: entry
Species	Human	Mouse
Entrez	939	21940
Ensembl	ENSG00000139193	ENSMUSG00000030336
UniProt	P26842	P41272
RefSeq (mRNA)	NM_001242	NM_001033126; NM_001042564; NM_001286753
RefSeq (protein)	NP_001233	NP_001028298; NP_001036029; NP_001273682
Location (UCSC)	Chr 12: 6.44 – 6.45 Mb	Chr 6: 125.21 – 125.21 Mb
PubMed search
- Wikidata
View/Edit Human	View/Edit Mouse

CD27 is a member of the tumor necrosis factor receptor superfamily. It is currently of interest to immunologists as a co-stimulatory immune checkpoint molecule, and is the target of an anti-cancer drug in clinical trials.

== Expression ==
During mouse embryonic development, specific (medium) expression levels of CD27 (in addition to high cKit, medium Gata2, and high CD31 expression levels) define the very first adult definitive hematopoietic stem cells generated in the aorta-gonad-mesonephros region. Furthermore, CD27 is expressed on both naïve and activated effector T cells as well as NK cells and activated B cells. It is a type I transmembrane protein with cysteine-rich domains, but once T cells have become activated, a soluble form of CD27 can be shed.

== Function ==
The protein encoded by this gene is a member of the TNF-receptor superfamily. This receptor is required for generation and long-term maintenance of T cell immunity. It binds to ligand CD70, and plays a key role in regulating B-cell activation and immunoglobulin synthesis.

When CD27 binds CD70, a signaling cascade leads to the differentiation and clonal expansion of T cells. The cascade also results in improved survival and memory of cytotoxic T cells and increased production of certain cytokines. This receptor transduces signals that lead to the activation of NF-κB and MAPK8/JNK. Adaptor proteins TRAF2, TRAF3, and TRAF5 have been shown to mediate the signaling process of this receptor via ubiquitination. CD27-binding protein (SIVA), a proapoptotic protein, can bind to this receptor and is thought to play an important role in the apoptosis induced by this receptor.

In murine γδ T cells its expression has been correlated with the secretion of IFNγ.

== Clinical significance ==
=== As a drug target ===
Varlilumab is an IgG1 antibody that binds to CD27 and is an experimental cancer treatment. This agonist antibody stimulates CD27 when it binds. The drug is in early clinical trials and appears to stimulate T cells and increase production of cytokines such as interferon-gamma.

== Interactions ==
CD27 has been shown to interact with SIVA1, TRAF2 and TRAF3.

== Mutations ==
Some mutations can decrease the expression of CD27. Three such mutations, C53Y, C96Y, and R107C, are located in the cysteine-rich domains of CD27.
