= Death receptor 6 =

Protein found in humans

TNFRSF21
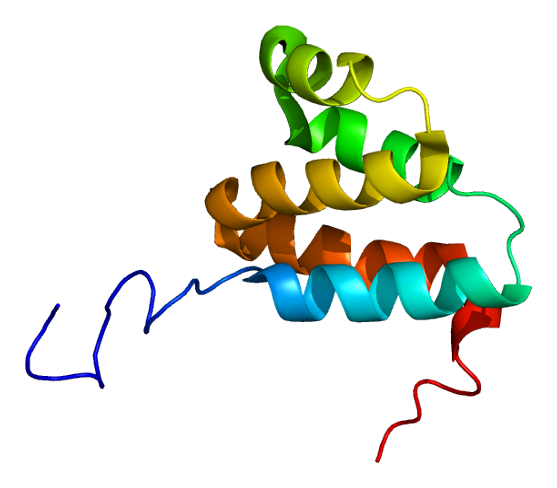

Identifiers
- Aliases: TNFRSF21, BM-018, CD358, DR6, tumor necrosis factor receptor superfamily member 21, TNF receptor superfamily member 21
- External IDs: OMIM: 605732; MGI: 2151075; GeneCards: TNFRSF21
Available structures
PDB	Ortholog search: PDBe RCSB
PDB	List of PDB id codes 3QO4, 3U3P, 3U3Q, 3U3S, 3U3T, 3U3V, 2DBH

Gene location (Human)
Chr.	Chromosome 6 (human)
Band	6p12.3	Start	47,231,532 bp
Band	6p12.3	End	47,309,905 bp

Gene location (Mouse)
Chr.	Chromosome 17 (mouse)
Band	17|17 B3	Start	43,327,446 bp
Band	17|17 B3	End	43,400,080 bp
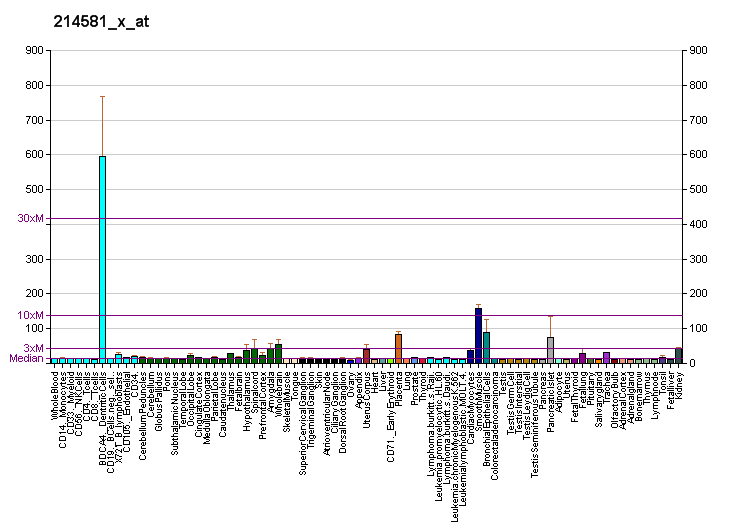

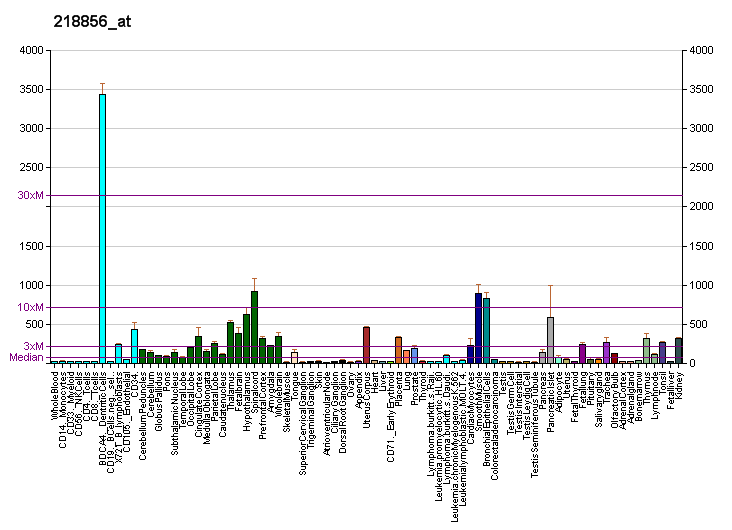
RNA expression pattern
Bgee	Human / Mouse (ortholog); Top expressed in: islet of Langerhans; mucosa of urinary bladder; periodontal fiber; subthalamic nucleus; epithelium of nasopharynx; inferior ganglion of vagus nerve; pons; lateral nuclear group of thalamus; beta cell; pars reticulata / Top expressed in: right kidney; epithelium of stomach; decidua; pyloric antrum; proximal tubule; mucous cell of stomach; human kidney; facial motor nucleus; granulocyte; anterior horn of spinal cord; More reference expression data
BioGPS	More reference expression data
Gene ontology
Molecular function	tumor necrosis factor-activated receptor activity
Cellular component	integral component of membrane; membrane; integral component of plasma membrane; axon; plasma membrane; intrinsic component of plasma membrane; cytoplasm
Biological process	regulation of apoptotic process; immune system process; cellular response to tumor necrosis factor; response to lipopolysaccharide; regulation of cell population proliferation; immune response; apoptotic signaling pathway; inflammatory response; negative regulation of myelination; signal transduction; apoptotic process; oligodendrocyte apoptotic process; negative regulation of B cell proliferation; neuron apoptotic process; humoral immune response; myelination; negative regulation of T cell proliferation; T cell receptor signaling pathway; tumor necrosis factor-mediated signaling pathway; B cell apoptotic process; adaptive immune response; regulation of oligodendrocyte differentiation; regulation of lipid metabolic process; axonal fasciculation
Sources:Amigo / QuickGO
Orthologs
Databases	NCBI: entry; OMA: entry
Species	Human	Mouse
Entrez	27242	94185
Ensembl	ENSG00000146072	ENSMUSG00000023915
UniProt	O75509	Q9EPU5
RefSeq (mRNA)	NM_014452	NM_178589
RefSeq (protein)	NP_055267	NP_848704
Location (UCSC)	Chr 6: 47.23 – 47.31 Mb	Chr 17: 43.33 – 43.4 Mb
PubMed search
- Wikidata
View/Edit Human	View/Edit Mouse

Death receptor 6 (DR6), also known as tumor necrosis factor receptor superfamily member 21 (TNFRSF21), is a cell surface receptor of the tumor necrosis factor receptor superfamily which activates the JNK and NF-κB pathways. It is mostly expressed in the thymus, spleen and white blood cells. The Gene for DR6 is 78,450 bases long and is found on the 6th chromosome. This is transcribed into a 655 amino acid chain weighing 71.8 kDa. Post transcriptional modifications of this protein include glycosylation on the asparagines at the 82, 141, 252, 257, 278, and 289 amino acid locations.

== Function ==
The protein encoded by this gene is a member of the TNF-receptor superfamily. This receptor has been shown to activate NF-κB and MAPK8/JNK, and induce cell apoptosis. Through its death domain, this receptor interacts with TRADD protein, which is known to serve as an adaptor that mediates signal transduction of TNF-receptors. Knockout studies in mice suggested that this gene plays a role in T helper cell activation, and may be involved in inflammation and immune regulation. The DR6 is an alpha-helical integral membrane receptor protein that shows evidence that it has something to do with the inhibition of blood vessels forming on tumors which would allow them to grow larger. Death receptor 6 gets a chemical message and starts a signaling pathway that causes apoptosis, also known as cell death, to occur. It is also expressed in endothelial cells. Tumor cells can induce, through exposition of amyloid precursor protein (APP), DR6-mediated endothelial cell necroptosis allowing tumors metastasis.

== Clinical significance ==
The free serum levels of this DR6 are heightened with anti-cell death factors in patients that have later stage ovarian cancer.

DR6 is also thought to be involved in neurodegeneration in the brain that causes Alzheimer's disease as well as signal transduction in stress response and cellular survival. DR6 induces apoptosis when it is over expressed, however the manner in which the death signal is intracellularly transduced is currently unknown. It has been determined that Bax translocation is necessary for the apoptosis triggered by DR6, but through an unknown pathway instead of the traditional pathways of intrinsic versus extrinsic. APP (amyloid precursor protein) is the natural ligand of DR6 and is first cleaved into Aβ and N-APP. N-APP is the fragment that interacts with DR6 to trigger axonal degradation in Alzheimer's patients. This pathway is essentially "hi-jacked" in the aging brain.
