= Ectodysplasin A receptor =

Protein found in humans

EDAR

Identifiers
- Aliases: EDAR, DL, ECTD10A, ECTD10B, ED1R, ED3, ED5, EDA-A1R, EDA1R, EDA3, HRM1, ectodysplasin A receptor
- External IDs: OMIM: 604095; MGI: 1343498; GeneCards: EDAR

Gene location (Human)
Chr.	Chromosome 2 (human)
Band	2q13	Start	108,894,471 bp
Band	2q13	End	108,989,372 bp

Gene location (Mouse)
Chr.	Chromosome 10 (mouse)
Band	10 B4|10 29.37 cM	Start	58,436,611 bp
Band	10 B4|10 29.37 cM	End	58,511,476 bp
RNA expression pattern
Bgee	Human / Mouse (ortholog); Top expressed in: secondary oocyte; pancreatic ductal cell; testicle; tibialis anterior muscle; oral cavity; mucosa of ileum; skin of hip; rectum; mucosa of urinary bladder; mucosa of paranasal sinus / Top expressed in: hair; morula; enamel organ; enamel knot; mandibular molars; tracheal cartilage; prostatic epithelium; hair bulb; secondary oocyte; embryo; More reference expression data
BioGPS	More reference expression data
Gene ontology
Molecular function	protein binding; transmembrane signaling receptor activity; signaling receptor activity
Cellular component	integral component of membrane; apical part of cell; membrane; plasma membrane
Biological process	hair follicle development; odontogenesis of dentin-containing tooth; pigmentation; multicellular organism development; salivary gland cavitation; cell differentiation; positive regulation of gene expression; tumor necrosis factor-mediated signaling pathway; epidermis development; apoptotic process; positive regulation of JNK cascade; positive regulation of I-kappaB kinase/NF-kappaB signaling; positive regulation of NIK/NF-kappaB signaling
Sources:Amigo / QuickGO
Orthologs
Databases	NCBI: entry; OMA: entry
Species	Human	Mouse
Entrez	10913	13608
Ensembl	ENSG00000135960	ENSMUSG00000003227
UniProt	Q9UNE0	Q9R187
RefSeq (mRNA)	NM_022336	NM_010100
RefSeq (protein)	NP_071731	NP_034230
Location (UCSC)	Chr 2: 108.89 – 108.99 Mb	Chr 10: 58.44 – 58.51 Mb
PubMed search
- Wikidata
View/Edit Human	View/Edit Mouse

Ectodysplasin A receptor (EDAR) is a protein that in humans is encoded by the EDAR gene. EDAR is a cell surface receptor for ectodysplasin A which plays an important role in the development of ectodermal tissues such as the skin. It is structurally related to members of the TNF receptor superfamily.

== Function ==
EDAR and other genes provide instructions for making proteins that work together during embryonic development. These proteins form part of a signaling pathway that is critical for the interaction between two cell layers, the ectoderm and the mesoderm. In the early embryo, these cell layers form the basis for many of the body's organs and tissues. Ectoderm-mesoderm interactions are essential for the proper formation of several structures that arise from the ectoderm, including the skin, hair, nails, teeth, and sweat glands.

== Clinical significance ==
Mutations in this gene have been associated with hypohidrotic ectodermal dysplasia, a disorder characterized by a lower density of sweat glands.

== Derived EDAR allele ==
A derived G-allele point mutation (SNP) with pleiotropic effects in EDAR, 370A or rs3827760, is found in ancient and modern East Asians, North Asians, Southeast Asians, Nepalese, and Native Americans but not common in African or European populations. Experimental research in mice has linked the derived allele to a number of traits, including greater hair shaft diameter, more numerous sweat glands, smaller mammary fat pad, and increased mammary gland density. A 2008 study stated that EDAR is a genetic determinant for hair thickness, and also contributed to variations in hair thickness among Asian populations. Derived variants of EDAR are associated with multiple facial and dental characteristics, such as shovel-shaped incisors. This mutation is also implicated in ear morphology differences and reduced chin protrusion.

A 2013 study suggested that the EDAR variant (370A) arose about 35,000 years ago in central China, a period during which the region was then quite warm and humid. A subsequent study from 2021, based on ancient DNA samples, has suggested that the derived variant became dominant among Ancient Northern East Asians shortly after the Last Glacial Maximum in Northeast Asia, around 19,000 years ago. Ancient remains from Northern East Asia, such as the Tianyuan Man (40,000 years old) and the AR33K (33,000 years old) specimen lacked the derived EDAR allele, while ancient East Asian remains after the LGM carry the derived EDAR allele.

It has been hypothesized that natural selection favored this allele during the last ice age in a population of people living in isolation in Beringia, as it may play a role in the synthesis of Vitamin D-rich breast milk in dark environments. One study suggested that because the EDAR mutation arose in a cool and dry environment, it may have been adaptive by increasing skin lubrication, thus reducing dryness in exposed facial structures.

The frequency of 370A is most highly elevated in modern North Asian and East Asian populations, followed by Native American populations, but is virtually absent in other populations around the world. In a study of 222 Korean and 265 Japanese subjects, the 370A mutation was found in 86.9% Korean (Busan) and 77.5% Japanese (Tokyo) subjects. Many Native Americans today have significant European admixture and Europeans lack this EDAR variant entirely, so it is likely that the occurrence of 370A among Native Americans was originally much higher prior to the European colonization of the Americas.

The derived G-allele is a variation of the A-allele in earlier hominids, the version found in most modern non-East Asian and non-Native American populations and is found in 100% of Native American skeletal remains within all Native American haplogroups which studies have been done on prior to all contact from foreign population from Africa, Europe, or Asia. The derived allele was present in both the Tibeto-Burman (Magar and Newar) and Indo-European (Brahmin) populations of Nepal. The highest 1540C allele frequency was observed in Magar (71%), followed by Newar (30%) and Brahmin (20%).

50% of ancient DNA samples (7,900-7,500 BP) from Motala, Sweden; two (3300–3000 BC) from the Afanasevo culture and one (400–200 BC) Scythian sample were found to carry the rs3827760 mutation.

According to a 2018 study, several ancient DNA samples from the Americas, including USR1 from the Upward Sun River site, Anzick-1, and the 9,600 BP individual from Lapa do Santo, were found to not carry the derived allele. This suggests that the increased frequency of the derived allele occurred independently in both East Asia and the Americas.

A 2021 study analyzed the DNA of 6 Jomon remains from Japan and found that none of them carried the derived EDAR allele that is fixed in modern East Asian populations.

== See also ==
- Ectodysplasin A2 receptor
