= TNFSF9 =

Protein-coding gene in humans

Identifiers
- Aliases: TNFSF9, 4-1BB-L, CD137L, TNLG5A, tumor necrosis factor superfamily member 9, TNF superfamily member 9
- External IDs: OMIM: 606182; MGI: 1101058; GeneCards: TNFSF9
Available structures
PDB	Ortholog search: PDBe RCSB
PDB	List of PDB id codes 2X29

Gene location (Human)
Chr.	Chromosome 19 (human)
Band	19p13.3	Start	6,531,026 bp
Band	19p13.3	End	6,535,924 bp

Gene location (Mouse)
Chr.	Chromosome 17 (mouse)
Band	17|17 D	Start	57,412,325 bp
Band	17|17 D	End	57,414,757 bp
RNA expression pattern
Bgee	Human / Mouse (ortholog); Top expressed in: buccal mucosa cell; testicle; internal globus pallidus; vagina; Brodmann area 9; right frontal lobe; upper lobe of left lung; prefrontal cortex; muscle of thigh; cerebellar hemisphere / Top expressed in: gastrula; decidua; blastocyst; embryo; embryo; cumulus cell; humerus; ventricular zone; medial ganglionic eminence; stroma of bone marrow; More reference expression data
BioGPS	n/a
Gene ontology
Molecular function	tumor necrosis factor receptor binding; cytokine activity; signaling receptor binding; tumor necrosis factor receptor superfamily binding
Cellular component	integral component of membrane; membrane; extracellular space; plasma membrane
Biological process	cell-cell signaling; cell population proliferation; immune response; signal transduction; apoptotic process; positive regulation of activated T cell proliferation; positive regulation of cytotoxic T cell differentiation; tumor necrosis factor-mediated signaling pathway; regulation of signaling receptor activity; regulation of T cell proliferation; regulation of apoptotic process
Sources:Amigo / QuickGO
Orthologs
Databases	NCBI: entry; OMA: entry
Species	Human	Mouse
Entrez	8744	21950
Ensembl	ENSG00000125657	ENSMUSG00000035678
UniProt	P41273	P41274
RefSeq (mRNA)	NM_003811	NM_009404
RefSeq (protein)	NP_003802	NP_033430
Location (UCSC)	Chr 19: 6.53 – 6.54 Mb	Chr 17: 57.41 – 57.41 Mb
PubMed search
- Wikidata
View/Edit Human	View/Edit Mouse

Tumor necrosis factor ligand superfamily member 9 also known as 4-1BB ligand or 4-1BBL or CD137L is a protein that in humans is encoded by the TNFSF9 gene.

4-1BBL is a type 2 transmembrane glycoprotein receptor that is found on APCs (antigen presenting cells) and binds to 4-1BB (also known as CD137). The 4-1BB/4-1BBL complex belongs to the TNFR:TNF superfamily, which is expressed on activated T Lymphocytes.

== Structure ==
TNFSF9 consists of an extracellular domain responsible for receptor binding, a transmembrane region, and a short intracellular domain, and can also exist in a soluble form when cleaved from the membrane. This structural organization enables TNFSF9 to function as a bidirectional signal transducer, facilitating costimulatory signaling crucial for T cell activation and immune response modulation.

=== Receptor/ligand complex ===
TNFSF9 forms a trimeric complex on the cell surface, which interacts with the 4-1BB (CD137) receptor on activated T lymphocytes. Each 4-1BB monomer binds to two 4-1BBL subunits via cysteine-rich domains (CRDs), with the CRD2 and CRD3 regions of 4-1BB engaging specific loops on 4-1BBL to stabilize the interaction through multiple hydrogen bonds.

The 4-1BB/4-1BBL complex consists of three monomeric 4-1BBs bound to a trimeric 4-1BBL. Each 4-1BB monomer binds to two 4-1BBLs via cysteine-rich domains (CRDs). The interaction between 4-1BB and the second 4-1BBL is required to stabilize their interactions. The link with 4-1BBL is largely made up of amino acids from the dynamic loops of the CRD2 and the β sheet of CRD3 of 4-1BB, according to a detailed study of the binding between the 4-1BB and 4-1BBL interface. CRD2 amino acids (T61, Q67, and K69) interact with the AA′ loop (Y110 and G114) and the intra-H-strand loop (Q227 and Q230) of 4-1BBL to form various hydrogen bond interactions.

== Function ==
TNFSF9 plays a key role in immune cell interactions. TNFSF9 forms a trimeric complex on the cell surface, which interacts with the 4-1BB (CD137) receptor on activated T lymphocytes. Complex formation with its receptor enables TNFSF9 to function as a bidirectional signal transducer, facilitating costimulatory signaling crucial for T cell activation and immune response modulation.

== Clinical significance ==
Early studies using the poorly immunogenic Ag104A sarcoma and highly tumorigenic P815 mastocytoma models provided the first systematic evidence that anti-4-1BB antibodies exert strong anti-tumor effects. These antibodies were found to significantly suppress tumor growth by enhancing cytotoxic T lymphocyte (CTL) activity. Subsequent research has consistently confirmed the role of 4-1BB signaling in promoting anti-tumor immunity.

The 4-1BB/4-1BBL interaction delivers costimulatory signals that enhance T-cell responses, a mechanism with significant implications for cancer immunotherapy. When combined with T-cell receptor signaling, this interaction stimulates both CD4^{+} and CD8^{+} T cells, contributing to effective anti-tumor responses. However, in human CD28^{−} T cells, 4-1BB signaling can promote expansion of this subset, which is associated with adverse outcomes in cancer and other diseases. As a result, modulating this pathway represents a promising therapeutic strategy.

== See also ==
- CD137
