= Urelumab =

Monoclonal antibody

Monoclonal antibody
- Type: Whole antibody
- Source: Human
- Target: CD137

Clinical data
- Other names: BMS-663513
- ATC code: none

Identifiers
- CAS Number: 934823-49-1
- ChemSpider: none
- UNII: 230902QLLC
- KEGG: D09984

Chemical and physical data
- Formula: C_{6502}H_{9972}N_{1712}O_{2030}S_{44}
- Molar mass: 146015.89 g·mol^{−1}

Urelumab (BMS-663513 or anti-4-1BB antibody) is a fully human, non‐ligand binding, CD137 agonist immunoglobulin‐γ 4 (IgG4) monoclonal antibody. It was developed utilizing Medarex's UltiMAb(R) technology by Bristol-Myers Squibb for the treatment of cancer and solid tumors. Urelumab promotes anti-tumor immunity, or an immune response against tumor cells, via CD137 activation. The application of Urelumab has been limited because it can cause severe liver toxicity.

== Mechanism of action ==
Urelumab targets the extracellular domain of CD137 (4-1BB).

CD137 is a co-stimulatory molecule that’s a member of the tumor necrosis factor (TNF) receptor superfamily. The CD137 gene is located within the chromosome 1 p36 locus. CD137 is expressed on the surfaces of activated CD8+ and CD4+ T cells, natural killer (NK) cells, dendritic cells, B cells, monocytes, and neutrophils. Urelumab targets, binds to, and activates the CD137 receptor on these CD137-expressing immune cells.

The activation of CD137 signaling by urelumab promotes anti-tumor immunity through a variety of mechanisms.

CD137 activation by urelumab stimulates a strong cytotoxic T cell response against tumor cells which results in tumor clearance. Urelumab achieves this by promoting the proliferation and survival of activated CD8+ T cells and upregulating their activity and effector functioning by allowing for increased levels of cytokine production (IL-2 and IFN‐γ) and higher cytotoxic capacity of activated CD8+ T cells. It also results in increased formation of memory T cells, which is crucial for creating a long-term anti-tumor response.

CD137 activation by urelumab also strengthens other aspects of the innate and adaptive immune response against tumor cells. CD137 activation promotes the proliferation and survival of natural killer cells which carry out antibody-dependent cell-mediated cytotoxicity of tumor cells. CD137 activation also promotes the proliferation and survival of B cells and CD4+ T cells, the differentiation of monocytes into dendritic cells, and the secretion of cytokines from these cell types.

== Clinical trials ==
Because of its ability to promote anti-tumor immunity with memory in cancer patients, Urelumab is an innovative and promising cancer immunotherapy.

The first phase I trial of urelumab began in 2006 and final results were published in 2015.

Current clinical trials combine Urelumab with chemotherapy (NCT00351325), chemoradiation (NCT00461110), ipilimumab (NCT00803374), rituximab (NCT01775631, NCT02420938), cetuximab (NCT02110082), and elotuzumab (NCT02252263), nivolumab (NCT02253992) for metastatic solid tumors, NSCLC, melanoma, B-cell non-Hodgkin lymphoma, colorectal cancer, and multiple myeloma. A biomarker study using CyTOF is also underway.

== Liver toxicity ==
The success of urelumab in promoting anti-tumor immunity in clinical trials has been hampered by the fact that it is dose-limited. When administered in amounts beyond the maximum tolerated dose, urelumab has resulted in hepatotoxicity in human patients enrolled in urelumab clinical studies.

In phase I and II clinical trials, Urelumab caused severe hepatotoxicity in more than 5% of patients enrolled. After two hepatotoxicity-related deaths in December 2008, enrollment was halted in all urelumab clinical studies globally, but were restarted in 2012.

Urelumab induces liver toxicity by activating liver Kupffer cells. The receptor FcγRIIB is expressed on both CD8+ T cells and liver Kupffer cells. Because of this, CD8+ T cell activation by Urelumab simultaneously induces the activation of liver Kupffer cells, which causes these macrophages to infiltrate the liver and cause hepatocyte damage.

Results from integrated safety analyses of Urelumab dosages across Urelumab clinical studies indicates that doses of ≥1 mg/kg every three weeks will result in high levels of hepatotoxicity and transaminitis. However, Urelumab dosed at 0.1 mg/kg or lower every 3 weeks was demonstrated to be safe, and didn’t result in hepatotoxicity, and is the current recommended maximum tolerated dose in human patients enrolled in Urelumab clinical studies.

While urelumab provides promising results for clinical efficacy against tumors, these responses were achieved in mouse models that administered Urelumab above this maximum tolerated dose. This issue has hindered the clinical success of urelumab today in establishing anti-tumor immunity in human cancer patients.
