= Varlilumab =

Anti-CD27 antibody and helps activate T-cells

Monoclonal antibody
- Type: ?
- Source: Human
- Target: CD27

Clinical data
- Other names: CDX-1127
- ATC code: none

Identifiers
- CAS Number: 1393344-72-3
- ChemSpider: none
- UNII: 0125DUV5XC

Chemical and physical data
- Formula: C_{6486}H_{9992}N_{1740}O_{2022}S_{42}
- Molar mass: 146043.96 g·mol^{−1}

Varlilumab (INN; development code CDX-1127) is a monoclonal antibody designed for immunotherapy for solid tumors and hematologic malignancies. It is an anti-CD27 antibody and helps activate T-cells.

This drug was developed by Celldex Therapeutics.

It (in combination with ONT-10) has undergone a phase 1B clinical trial for advanced breast or ovarian cancer. In combination with anti-PD-1 nivolumab it has undergone a phase 1/2 trial for advanced refractory solid tumours
