= TNFRSF9 =

Protein found in humans

Identifiers
- Aliases: TNFRSF9, 4-1BB, CD137, CDw137, ILA, tumor necrosis factor receptor superfamily member 9, TNF receptor superfamily member 9
- External IDs: OMIM: 602250; MGI: 1101059; GeneCards: TNFRSF9
Available structures
PDB	Ortholog search: PDBe RCSB
PDB	List of PDB id codes 1D0J

Gene location (Human)
Chr.	Chromosome 1 (human)
Band	1p36.23	Start	7,915,871 bp
Band	1p36.23	End	7,943,165 bp

Gene location (Mouse)
Chr.	Chromosome 4 (mouse)
Band	4 E2|4 81.52 cM	Start	150,999,019 bp
Band	4 E2|4 81.52 cM	End	151,030,559 bp
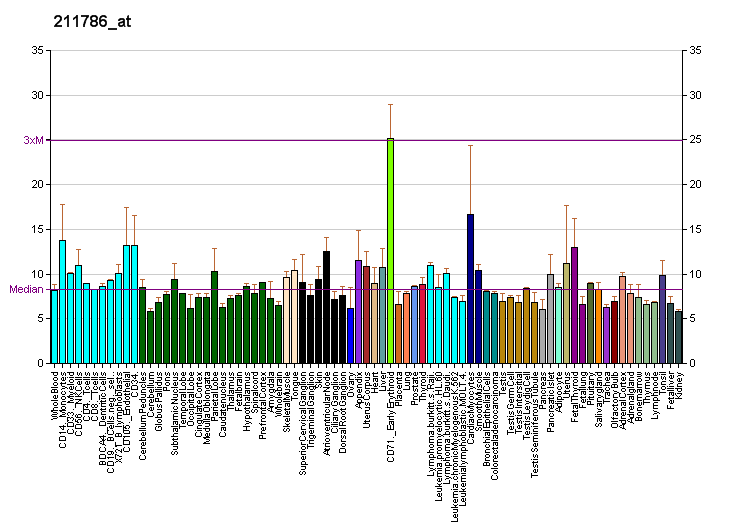

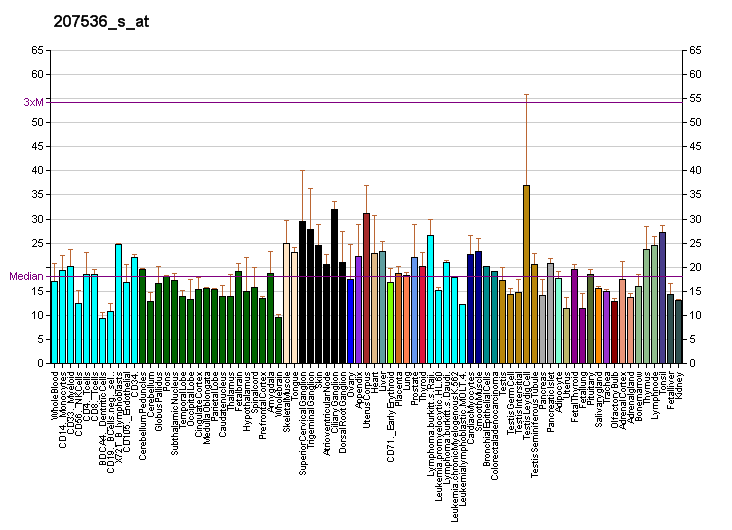
RNA expression pattern
Bgee	Human / Mouse (ortholog); Top expressed in: buccal mucosa cell; lymph node; cartilage tissue; testicle; blood; appendix; white blood cell; monocyte; granulocyte; gallbladder / Top expressed in: decidua; gastrula; blastocyst; thymus; lymph node; mesenteric lymph nodes; islet of Langerhans; uterus; morula; blood; More reference expression data
BioGPS	More reference expression data
Gene ontology
Molecular function	cytokine binding; tumor necrosis factor-activated receptor activity; signaling receptor activity
Cellular component	integral component of membrane; integral component of plasma membrane; membrane; external side of plasma membrane; extracellular space; plasma membrane
Biological process	multicellular organism development; regulation of apoptotic process; response to lipopolysaccharide; inflammatory response; immune response; protein homotrimerization; apoptotic process; negative regulation of cell population proliferation; tumor necrosis factor-mediated signaling pathway; regulation of cell population proliferation; apoptotic signaling pathway
Sources:Amigo / QuickGO
Orthologs
Databases	NCBI: entry; OMA: entry
Species	Human	Mouse
Entrez	3604	21942
Ensembl	ENSG00000049249	ENSMUSG00000028965
UniProt	Q07011	P20334
RefSeq (mRNA)	NM_001561	NM_001077508; NM_001077509; NM_011612
RefSeq (protein)	NP_001552	NP_001070976; NP_001070977; NP_035742
Location (UCSC)	Chr 1: 7.92 – 7.94 Mb	Chr 4: 151 – 151.03 Mb
PubMed search
- Wikidata
View/Edit Human	View/Edit Mouse

TNF receptor superfamily member 9, a member of the TNF receptor superfamily, is a type 1 transmembrane protein, expressed on surfaces of leukocytes and non-immune cells. Its alternative names are CD137, 4-1BB, and induced by lymphocyte activation (ILA). It is of interest to immunologists as a co-stimulatory immune checkpoint molecule, and as a potential target in cancer immunotherapy. It is encoded by the TNFRSF9 gene.

== Expression ==
CD137 is only expressed on the T-cell cell surface after activation. When T cells are activated by Antigen Presenting Cells (APCs), CD137 becomes embedded in CD4+ and CD8+ T cells.

CD137 is a costimulatory molecule functioning to stimulate T cell proliferation, dendritic cell maturation, and promotion of B cell antibody secretion. As a T cell co-stimulator, T cell receptor (TCR) and CD28 signaling causes expression of CD137 on T cell membranes. When CD137 then reacts with the CD137 ligand, it leads to CD137 upregulation. This is a form of self regulation or positive feedback cycle. When CD137 interacts with its ligand, it leads to T cell cytokine production and T cell proliferation, among other signaling pathway responses.

Other cells that express CD137 include both immune cells (i.e. monocytes, natural killer cells, dendritic cells, follicular dendritic cells (FDCs), and regulatory T cells) and non-immune cells (i.e. chondrocytes, neurons, astrocytes, microglia and endothelial cells).

== Regulation of the immune system ==
CD137 and its ligand both induce signaling cascades upon interaction, a phenomenon known as bidirectional signal transduction. The CD137/ligand complex is also involved in regulation of the immune system. The CD137 ligand is a type-II transmembrane glycoprotein expressed on APCs. The CD137 ligand is normally expressed at low levels, but can have increased expression in presence of pathogen associated molecular patterns (PAMPs) or proinflammatory immune responses like IL-1 secretion.

Cross-linking CD137 and active T cells can not only result in T cell proliferation via increased IL-2 secretion, but surviving cells also contribute to expanding immune system memory and augmenting T cell cytolytic activity.

== Atherosclerosis ==
=== Inflammation ===
Atherosclerosis is a disease, linked to Cardiovascular Disease (CVD), and associated with cardiac inflammation, in the form of lesions in the walls of the atrial chambers and other vasculature. Treatments designed to target the CD137 molecules expressed on immune cell surfaces often lead to T cell proliferation as CD137 stimulation allows for the T cells to continue through the cell cycle. In this way, CD137 is often referred to as an immune checkpoint. This proliferation eventually leads to other immune cell responses and secretion of proinflammatory cytokines which result in exaggerated inflammatory responses that exacerbate atherosclerosis. Ongoing studies are researching CD137 as a biomarker for atherosclerosis as well as CD137 antagonists as potential therapeutics to reduce the symptoms associated with the condition.

=== Endothelial cells ===
The mechanism connecting CD137 bidirectional signaling to the promotion of atherosclerosis is related to CD137 mediation of epithelial cell damage. When the CD137/CD137L complex interacts with endothelial cells, including those lining vascular structures, it induces the upregulation of molecules that promote inflammation and damage. For instance, increases in adhesion molecules, including vascular adhesion molecule-1 or intracellular adhesion molecule-1, on epithelial cells causes recruitment of immune cells like macrophages and neutrophils. When they arrive, these cells initiate proinflammatory responses including cytokine secretion. In chronic cases, this results in excessive inflammation of the epithelial tissue, leading to cell damage and the formation of atherosclerotic inflammatory lesions.

== Interactions ==
CD137 has been shown to interact with TRAF2.

== As a drug target ==
=== Cancer immunotherapy ===
CD137 is also involved in cancer having been found upregulated in cancerous cell lines. CD137/ligand stimulation has been found to lead to stronger anti-tumor responses due to cytotoxic T cell activation and is being examined as a possible anticancer therapy.

Current cancer immunotherapy treatments use monoclonal antibodies (mAbs) to target and kill cancer cells. Cancer cells upregulate cell surface CD137, however the reason behind this remains unclear. What is known is the fact that mAbs targeting CD137 are successful in fighting cancer as they can not only mark cancer cells, but they allow for CD8+ T cell activation and increased IFN-gamma secretion as per CD137's function as a costimulatory molecule. This enables the affected individual's immune system to actively target and kill cancer cells that express CD137 on their cell surfaces. Currently, Utomilumab is the only mAb targeting CD137 on the market. Urelumab trials were temporarily halted due to risk of liver toxicity. Utomilumab trials resulted in the drug's being cleared for therapeutic use.

=== Utomilumab ===
Utomilumab (PF-05082566) targets this receptor to stimulate a more intense immune system attack on cancers. It is a fully human IgG2 monoclonal antibody. It is in early clinical trials. As of June 2016, 5 clinical trials are active. In recent years, there has been a reignited interest in 4-1BB immunotherapy. Currently, there are several anti-4-1BB antibodies and recombinant proteins are in various stages of clinical trial.

== See also ==
- 4-1BB ligand
- Urelumab
