= Vascular endothelial growth inhibitor =

Protein-coding gene in the species Homo sapiens

TNFSF15
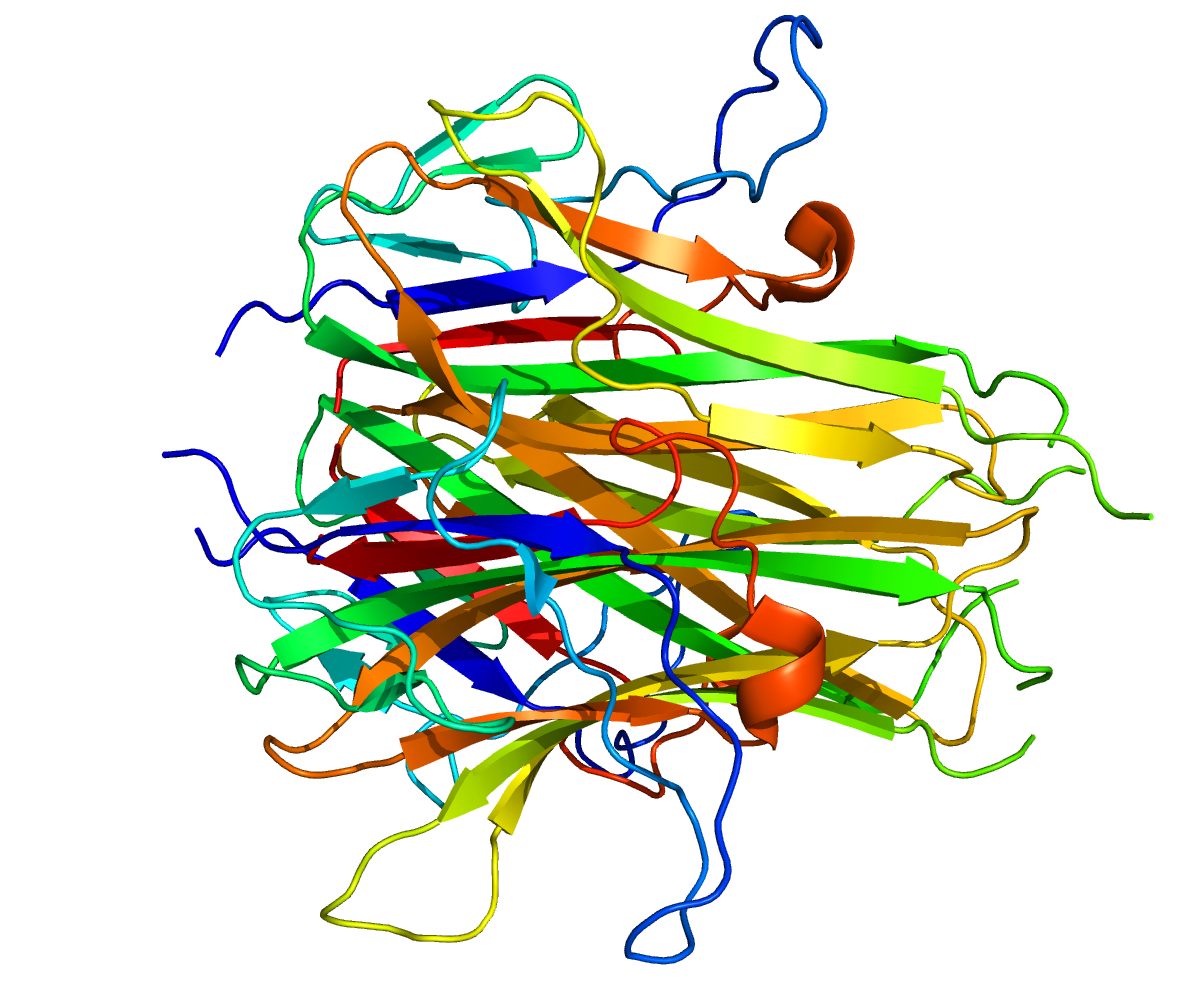

Identifiers
- Aliases: TNFSF15, TL1, TL1A, VEGI, VEGI192A, Vascular endothelial growth inhibitor, TNLG1B, tumor necrosis factor superfamily member 15, TNF superfamily member 15
- External IDs: OMIM: 604052; MGI: 2180140; GeneCards: TNFSF15
Available structures
PDB	Ortholog search: PDBe RCSB
PDB	List of PDB id codes 2O0O, 2QE3, 2RE9, 2RJK, 2RJL, 3K51, 3MI8

Gene location (Human)
Chr.	Chromosome 9 (human)
Band	9q32	Start	114,784,652 bp
Band	9q32	End	114,806,039 bp

Gene location (Mouse)
Chr.	Chromosome 4 (mouse)
Band	4|4 C1	Start	63,642,840 bp
Band	4|4 C1	End	63,663,350 bp
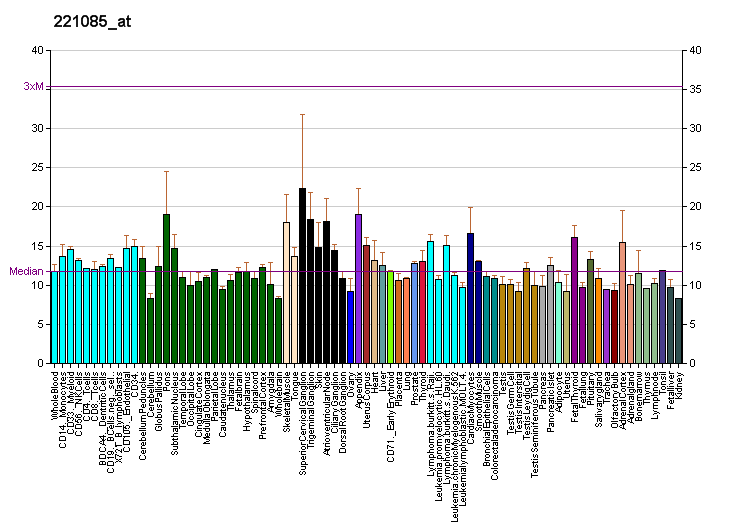
RNA expression pattern
Bgee	Human / Mouse (ortholog); Top expressed in: cartilage tissue; jejunal mucosa; duodenum; germinal epithelium; visceral pleura; palpebral conjunctiva; pancreatic ductal cell; parotid gland; urethra; mucosa of ileum / Top expressed in: embryo; right kidney; lung; human kidney; duodenum; ileum; renal cortex; jejunum; colon; zone of skin; More reference expression data
BioGPS	More reference expression data
Gene ontology
Molecular function	tumor necrosis factor receptor binding; cytokine activity; signaling receptor binding; protein binding
Cellular component	integral component of membrane; extracellular region; plasma membrane; integral component of plasma membrane; membrane; intracellular anatomical structure; extracellular space
Biological process	tumor necrosis factor-mediated signaling pathway; activation of cysteine-type endopeptidase activity involved in apoptotic process; activation of NF-kappaB-inducing kinase activity; immune response; apoptotic process; signal transduction; regulation of signaling receptor activity
Sources:Amigo / QuickGO
Orthologs
Databases	NCBI: entry; OMA: entry
Species	Human	Mouse
Entrez	9966	326623
Ensembl	ENSG00000181634	ENSMUSG00000050395
UniProt	O95150	Q5UBV8
RefSeq (mRNA)	NM_005118; NM_001204344	NM_177371
RefSeq (protein)	NP_001191273; NP_005109	NP_796345
Location (UCSC)	Chr 9: 114.78 – 114.81 Mb	Chr 4: 63.64 – 63.66 Mb
PubMed search
- Wikidata
View/Edit Human	View/Edit Mouse

Vascular endothelial growth inhibitor (VEGI), also known as TNF-like ligand 1A (TL1A) and TNF superfamily member 15 (TNFSF15), is protein that in humans is encoded by the TNFSF15 gene. VEGI is an anti-angiogenic protein. It belongs to tumor necrosis factor (ligand) superfamily, where it is member 15. It is the sole known ligand for death receptor 3, and it can also be recognized by decoy receptor 3.

== Function ==
The protein encoded by this gene is a cytokine that belongs to the tumor necrosis factor (TNF) ligand family. This protein is abundantly expressed in endothelial cells, but is not expressed in either B or T cells. The expression of this protein is inducible by TNF-alpha and IL-1 alpha. This cytokine is a ligand for receptor TNFRSF25 (death receptor 3) and TNFRSF6B (decoy receptor 3). It can activate both the NF-κB and MAPK signalling pathways, and acts as an autocrine factor to induce apoptosis in endothelial cells. This cytokine is also found to inhibit endothelial cell proliferation, and thus may function as an angiogenesis inhibitor. An additional isoform encoded by an alternatively spliced transcript variant has been reported but the sequence of this transcript has not been determined.

== Clinical relevance ==
Several TNFSF15 SNPs have been found to be strongly associated with inflammatory bowel disease. There is several clinical trials which investigate if neutralizing TL1A can be benefitial in IBD or other autoimmune diseases (Afimkibart, Tulisokibart, Duvakitug).
