= Ectodysplasin A2 receptor =

Protein-coding gene in humans

EDA2R

Identifiers
- Aliases: EDA2R, EDA-A2R, EDAA2R, TNFRSF27, XEDAR, ectodysplasin A2 receptor
- External IDs: OMIM: 300276; MGI: 2442860; GeneCards: EDA2R

Gene location (Human)
Chr.	X chromosome (human)
Band	Xq12	Start	66,595,637 bp
Band	Xq12	End	66,639,298 bp

Gene location (Mouse)
Chr.	X chromosome (mouse)
Band	X|X C3	Start	96,377,446 bp
Band	X|X C3	End	96,420,822 bp
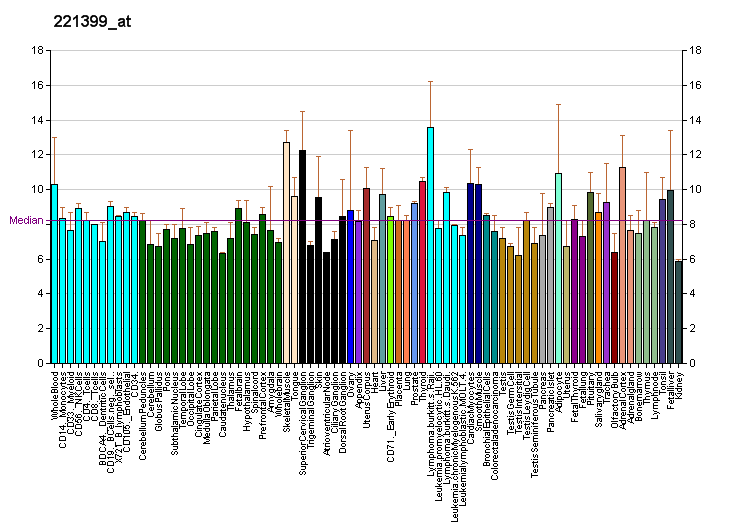
RNA expression pattern
Bgee	Human / Mouse (ortholog); Top expressed in: stromal cell of endometrium; right adrenal cortex; right uterine tube; Descending thoracic aorta; ascending aorta; testicle; smooth muscle tissue; left adrenal gland; canal of the cervix; left adrenal cortex / Top expressed in: temporal muscle; ankle; gastrocnemius muscle; endothelial cell of lymphatic vessel; triceps brachii muscle; muscle of thigh; quadriceps femoris muscle; soleus muscle; medial head of gastrocnemius muscle; tibialis anterior muscle; More reference expression data
BioGPS	More reference expression data
Gene ontology
Molecular function	protein binding; tumor necrosis factor-activated receptor activity; signaling receptor activity
Cellular component	integral component of membrane; integral component of plasma membrane; intracellular anatomical structure; membrane; plasma membrane
Biological process	multicellular organism development; cell differentiation; tumor necrosis factor-mediated signaling pathway; positive regulation of JNK cascade; positive regulation of NF-kappaB transcription factor activity; ectodermal cell differentiation; intrinsic apoptotic signaling pathway by p53 class mediator; epidermis development; tissue development; positive regulation of I-kappaB kinase/NF-kappaB signaling
Sources:Amigo / QuickGO
Orthologs
Databases	NCBI: entry; OMA: entry
Species	Human	Mouse
Entrez	60401	245527
Ensembl	ENSG00000131080	ENSMUSG00000034457
UniProt	Q9HAV5	Q8BX35
RefSeq (mRNA)	NM_001199687; NM_001199688; NM_001199689; NM_001242310; NM_021783 NM_001324199; NM_001324201; NM_001324202; NM_001324204; NM_001324205; NM_001324206	NM_001161432; NM_001161433; NM_175540
RefSeq (protein)	NP_001186616; NP_001229239; NP_001311128; NP_001311130; NP_001311131 NP_001311133; NP_001311134; NP_001311135; NP_068555	NP_001154904; NP_001154905; NP_780749
Location (UCSC)	Chr X: 66.6 – 66.64 Mb	Chr X: 96.38 – 96.42 Mb
PubMed search
- Wikidata
View/Edit Human	View/Edit Mouse

Tumor necrosis factor receptor superfamily member 27 is a protein that in humans is encoded by the EDA2R gene.

EDA-A1 and EDA-A2 are two isoforms of ectodysplasin that are encoded by the anhidrotic ectodermal dysplasia (EDA) gene. Mutations in EDA give rise to a clinical syndrome characterized by loss of hair, sweat glands, and teeth. The protein encoded by this gene specifically binds to EDA-A2 isoform. This protein is a type III transmembrane protein of the TNFR (tumor necrosis factor receptor) superfamily, and contains 3 cysteine-rich repeats and a single transmembrane domain but lacks an N-terminal signal peptide. Multiple alternatively spliced transcript variants have been found for this gene, but some variants lack sufficient support.
