= SIVA1 =

Protein-coding gene in the species Homo sapiens

Identifiers
- Aliases: SIVA1, CD27BP, SIVA, Siva-1, Siva-2, SIVA1 apoptosis inducing factor
- External IDs: OMIM: 605567; MGI: 1353606; GeneCards: SIVA1

Gene location (Human)
Chr.	Chromosome 14 (human)
Band	14q32.33	Start	104,753,147 bp
Band	14q32.33	End	104,768,494 bp

Gene location (Mouse)
Chr.	Chromosome 12 (mouse)
Band	12|12 F1	Start	112,611,113 bp
Band	12|12 F1	End	112,615,583 bp
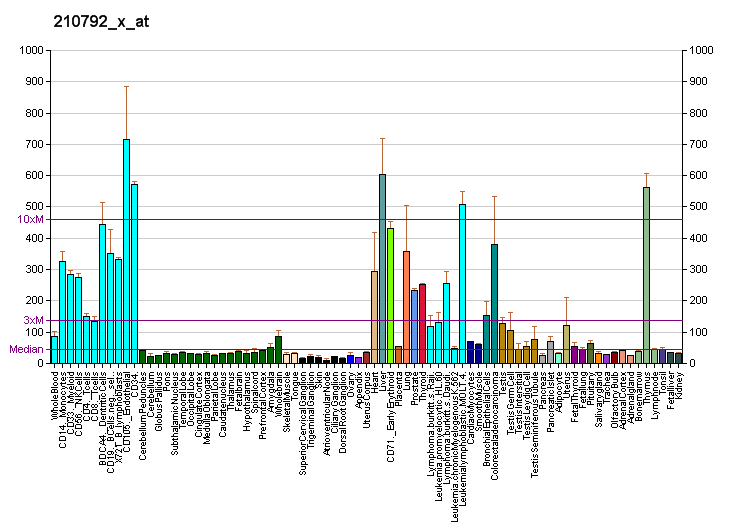

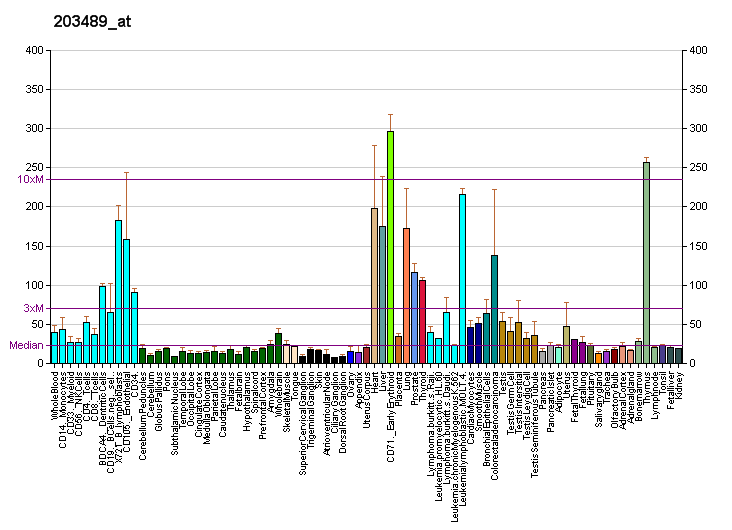
RNA expression pattern
Bgee	Human / Mouse (ortholog); Top expressed in: popliteal artery; tibial arteries; gastric mucosa; thoracic aorta; ascending aorta; muscle of thigh; anterior pituitary; right testis; left testis; muscle layer of sigmoid colon / Top expressed in: otic placode; renal corpuscle; medullary collecting duct; embryo; embryo; Gonadal ridge; condyle; zygote; otic vesicle; fossa; More reference expression data
BioGPS	More reference expression data
Gene ontology
Molecular function	zinc ion binding; protein binding; metal ion binding; virus receptor activity; tumor necrosis factor receptor binding; CD27 receptor binding
Cellular component	cytoplasm; mitochondrion; nucleus; nucleoplasm; intracellular anatomical structure
Biological process	apoptotic process; intrinsic apoptotic signaling pathway; viral process; activation-induced cell death of T cells; negative regulation of NF-kappaB transcription factor activity; positive regulation of mitochondrial outer membrane permeabilization involved in apoptotic signaling pathway; extrinsic apoptotic signaling pathway; viral entry into host cell
Sources:Amigo / QuickGO
Orthologs
Databases	NCBI: entry; OMA: entry
Species	Human	Mouse
Entrez	10572	30954
Ensembl	ENSG00000184990	ENSMUSG00000064326
UniProt	O15304	O54926
RefSeq (mRNA)	NM_006427; NM_021709	NM_001161737; NM_013929
RefSeq (protein)	NP_006418; NP_068355	NP_001155209; NP_038957
Location (UCSC)	Chr 14: 104.75 – 104.77 Mb	Chr 12: 112.61 – 112.62 Mb
PubMed search
- Wikidata
View/Edit Human	View/Edit Mouse

Apoptosis regulatory protein Siva is a protein that in humans is encoded by the SIVA1 gene. This gene encodes a protein with an important role in the apoptotic (programmed cell death) pathway induced by the CD27 antigen, a member of the tumor necrosis factor receptor (TFNR) superfamily. The CD27 antigen cytoplasmic tail binds to the N-terminus of this protein. Two alternatively spliced transcript variants encoding distinct proteins have been described.

== Interactions ==
SIVA1 has been shown to interact with CD27.

== Siva (protein) ==
Siva protein is a zinc-containing intracellular ligand of the CD4 receptor that promotes HIV-1 envelope-induced apoptosis in T-lymphoid cells. Recent research has demonstrated that Siva is a direct transcriptional target for the tumor-suppressors p53 and E2F1.

== See also ==
- Siva (protein)
