= Ectodysplasin A =

Protein-coding gene in humans

EDA
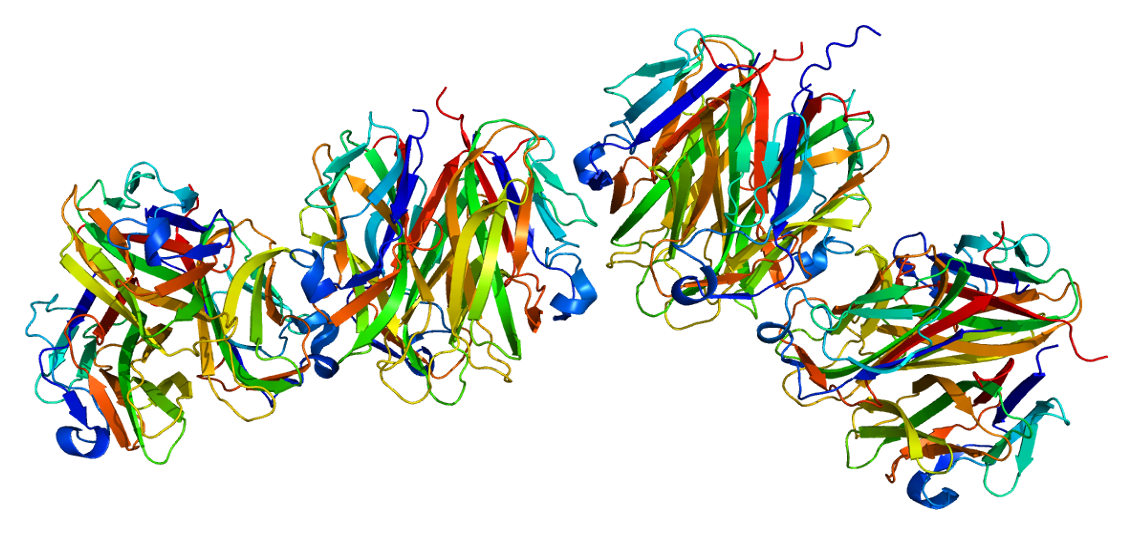

Identifiers
- Aliases: EDA, ECTD1, ED1, ED1-A1, ED1-A2, EDA-A1, EDA-A2, EDA1, EDA2, HED, HED1, ODT1, STHAGX1, XHED, XLHED, TNLG7C, ectodysplasin A
- External IDs: OMIM: 300451; MGI: 1195272; GeneCards: EDA
Available structures
| PDB | Ortholog search: PDBe RCSB |
| PDB | List of PDB id codes 1RJ7, 1RJ8 |

Gene location (Human)
| Chr. | X chromosome (human) |
| Band | Xq13.1 | Start | 69,616,067 bp |
| Band | Xq13.1 | End | 70,039,472 bp |

Gene location (Mouse)
| Chr. | X chromosome (mouse) |
| Band | X C3|X 43.59 cM | Start | 99,019,212 bp |
| Band | X C3|X 43.59 cM | End | 99,444,368 bp |
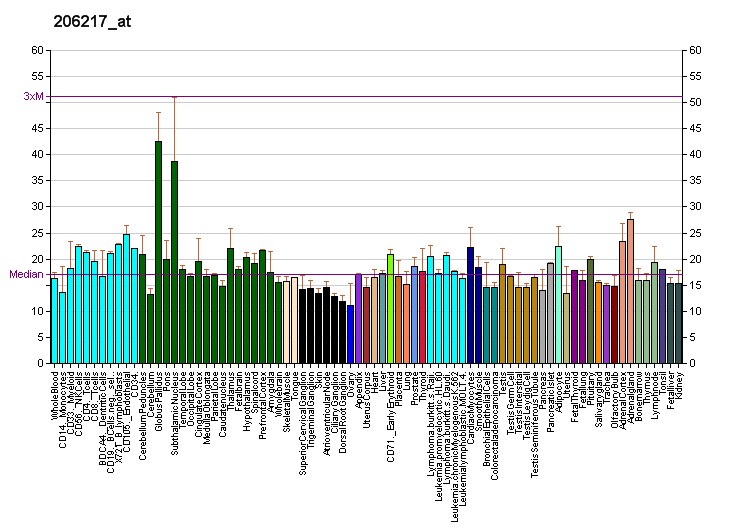
RNA expression pattern
| Bgee | Human / Mouse (ortholog); Top expressed in: testicle; oocyte; right auricle of heart; left adrenal gland; left adrenal cortex; secondary oocyte; right adrenal cortex; gonad; apex of heart; buccal mucosa cell / Top expressed in: dental lamina; saccule; ectoderm; otic vesicle; otic placode; outer enamel epithelium; entorhinal cortex; perirhinal cortex; choroid plexus of fourth ventricle; secondary oocyte; More reference expression data |
| BioGPS | More reference expression data |
Gene ontology
| Molecular function | protein binding; tumor necrosis factor receptor binding; signaling receptor binding; death receptor agonist activity; death receptor binding |
| Cellular component | integral component of membrane; collagen; endoplasmic reticulum membrane; membrane; plasma membrane; apical part of cell; integral component of plasma membrane; extracellular region; cytoskeleton; lipid droplet; intracellular membrane-bounded organelle |
| Biological process | trachea gland development; hair follicle placode formation; hair follicle development; cell differentiation; gene expression; positive regulation of canonical Wnt signaling pathway; salivary gland cavitation; tumor necrosis factor-mediated signaling pathway; multicellular organism development; positive regulation of gene expression; positive regulation of NF-kappaB transcription factor activity; immune response; positive regulation of I-kappaB kinase/NF-kappaB signaling; pigmentation; cell-matrix adhesion; skin development; cytokine-mediated signaling pathway; regulation of NIK/NF-kappaB signaling; odontogenesis of dentin-containing tooth; regulation of signaling receptor activity; positive regulation of NIK/NF-kappaB signaling |
Sources:Amigo / QuickGO
Orthologs
| Databases | NCBI: entry; OMA: entry |
| Species | Human | Mouse |
| Entrez | 1896 | 13607 |
| Ensembl | ENSG00000158813 | ENSMUSG00000059327 |
| UniProt | Q92838 | O54693 |
| RefSeq (mRNA) | NM_001005609; NM_001005610; NM_001005611; NM_001005612; NM_001005613 NM_001005614; NM_001399 | NM_001177937; NM_001177938; NM_001177939; NM_001177940; NM_001177941 NM_001177942; NM_001177943; NM_001177944; NM_010099 |
| RefSeq (protein) | NP_001005609; NP_001005610; NP_001005612; NP_001005613; NP_001390 | NP_001171408; NP_001171409; NP_001171410; NP_001171411; NP_001171412 NP_001171413; NP_001171414; NP_001171415; NP_034229 |
| Location (UCSC) | Chr X: 69.62 – 70.04 Mb | Chr X: 99.02 – 99.44 Mb |
| PubMed search |
- Wikidata
| View/Edit Human | View/Edit Mouse |

Ectodysplasin A (EDA) is a protein that in humans is encoded by the EDA gene.

Ectodysplasin A is a transmembrane protein of the TNF family which plays an important role in the development of ectodermal tissues such as skin in humans. It is recognized by the ectodysplasin A receptor.

== Function ==
The protein encoded by this gene is a type II membrane protein that can be cleaved by furin to produce a secreted form. The encoded protein, which belongs to the tumor necrosis factor family, acts as a homotrimer and may be involved in cell-cell signaling during the development of ectodermal organs. Along with c-Met, it has been shown to be involved in the differentiation of anatomical placodes, precursors of scales, feathers and hair follicles in vertebrates. Defects in this gene are a cause of ectodermal dysplasia, anhidrotic, which is also known as X-linked hypohidrotic ectodermal dysplasia. Several transcript variants encoding many different isoforms have been found for this gene. At least 61 disease-causing mutations in this gene have been discovered.
