= Death receptor 3 =

Protein found in humans

TNFRSF25

Identifiers
- Aliases: TNFRSF25, APO-3, DDR3, DR3, LARD, TNFRSF12, TR3, TRAMP, WSL-1, WSL-LR, tumor necrosis factor receptor superfamily member 25, TNF receptor superfamily member 25, GEF720, PLEKHG5
- External IDs: OMIM: 603366; MGI: 1934667; GeneCards: TNFRSF25

Gene location (Human)
Chr.	Chromosome 1 (human)
Band	1p36.31	Start	6,460,786 bp
Band	1p36.31	End	6,466,175 bp

Gene location (Mouse)
Chr.	Chromosome 4 (mouse)
Band	4|4 E2	Start	152,200,391 bp
Band	4|4 E2	End	152,204,576 bp
RNA expression pattern
Bgee	Human / Mouse (ortholog); Top expressed in: right hemisphere of cerebellum; anterior pituitary; granulocyte; skin of abdomen; skin of leg; right frontal lobe; right uterine tube; spleen; mucosa of transverse colon; sural nerve / Top expressed in: morula; primary visual cortex; embryo; blastocyst; superior frontal gyrus; dentate gyrus of hippocampal formation granule cell; embryo; muscle of thigh; yolk sac; lens; More reference expression data
BioGPS	n/a
Gene ontology
Molecular function	tumor necrosis factor-activated receptor activity; signaling receptor activity
Cellular component	integral component of membrane; extracellular region; cytosol; plasma membrane; integral component of plasma membrane; membrane
Biological process	regulation of apoptotic process; multicellular organism development; apoptotic signaling pathway; cell surface receptor signaling pathway; response to lipopolysaccharide; inflammatory response; tumor necrosis factor-mediated signaling pathway; regulation of cell population proliferation; immune response; signal transduction; apoptotic process
Sources:Amigo / QuickGO
Orthologs
Databases	NCBI: entry; OMA: entry
Species	Human	Mouse
Entrez	8718	85030
Ensembl	ENSG00000215788	ENSMUSG00000024793
UniProt	Q93038	n/a
RefSeq (mRNA)	NM_148974; NM_001039664; NM_003790; NM_148965; NM_148966 NM_148967; NM_148968; NM_148969; NM_148970; NM_148971; NM_148972; NM_148973	NM_001291010; NM_033042
RefSeq (protein)	NP_001034753; NP_003781; NP_683866; NP_683867; NP_683868 NP_683871	n/a
Location (UCSC)	Chr 1: 6.46 – 6.47 Mb	Chr 4: 152.2 – 152.2 Mb
PubMed search
- Wikidata
View/Edit Human	View/Edit Mouse

Death receptor 3 (DR3), also known as tumor necrosis factor receptor superfamily member 25 (TNFRSF25), is a cell surface receptor of the tumor necrosis factor receptor superfamily which mediates apoptotic signalling and differentiation. Its only known TNFSF ligand is TNF-like protein 1A (TL1A).

== Function ==
The protein encoded by this gene is a member of the TNF-receptor superfamily. This receptor is expressed preferentially by activated and antigen-experienced T lymphocytes. TNFRSF25 is also highly expressed by FoxP3 positive regulatory T lymphocytes. TNFRSF25 is activated by a monogamous ligand, known as TL1A (TNFSF15), which is rapidly upregulated in antigen presenting cells and some endothelial cells following Toll-Like Receptor or Fc receptor activation. This receptor has been shown to signal both through the TRADD adaptor molecule to stimulate NF-kappa B activity or through the FADD adaptor molecule to stimulate caspase activation and regulate cell apoptosis.

Multiple alternatively spliced transcript variants of this gene encoding distinct isoforms have been reported, most of which are potentially secreted molecules. The alternative splicing of this gene in B and T cells encounters a programmed change upon T-cell activation, which predominantly produces full-length, membrane bound isoforms, and is thought to be involved in controlling lymphocyte proliferation induced by T-cell activation. Specifically, activation of TNFRSF25 is dependent upon previous engagement of the T cell receptor. Following binding to TL1A, TNFRSF25 signaling increases the sensitivity of T cells to endogenous IL-2 via the IL-2 receptor and enhances T cell proliferation. Because the activation of the receptor is T cell receptor dependent, the activity of TNFRSF25 in vivo is specific to those T cells that are encountering cognate antigen. At rest, and for individuals without underlying autoimmunity, the majority of T cells that regularly encounter cognate antigen are FoxP3+ regulatory T cells. Stimulation of TNFRSF25, in the absence of any other exogenous signals, stimulates profound and highly specific proliferation of FoxP3+ regulatory T cells from their 8-10% of all CD4+ T cells to 35-40% of all CD4+ T cells within 5 days.

== Therapeutics ==
Therapeutic agonists of TNFRSF25 can be used to stimulate Treg expansion, which can reduce inflammation in experimental models of asthma, allogeneic solid organ transplantation and ocular keratitis. Similarly, because TNFRSF25 activation is antigen dependent, costimulation of TNFRSF25 together with an autoantigen or with a vaccine antigen can lead to exacerbation of immunopathology or enhanced vaccine-stimulated immunity, respectively. TNFRSF25 stimulation is therefore highly specific to T cell mediated immunity, which can be used to enhance or dampen inflammation depending on the temporal context and quality of foreign vs self antigen availability. Stimulation of TNFRSF25 in humans may lead to similar, but more controllable, effects as coinhibitory receptor blockade targeting molecules such as CTLA-4 and PD-1.
