= Incisor =

Front teeth of most mammals

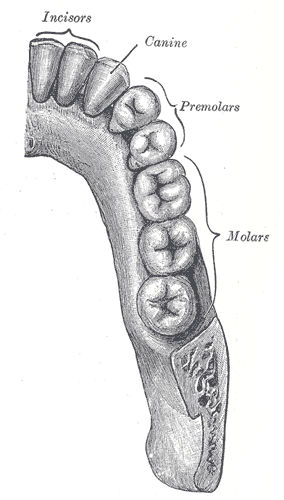
- Permanent teeth of the right half of the lower dental arch, seen from above.

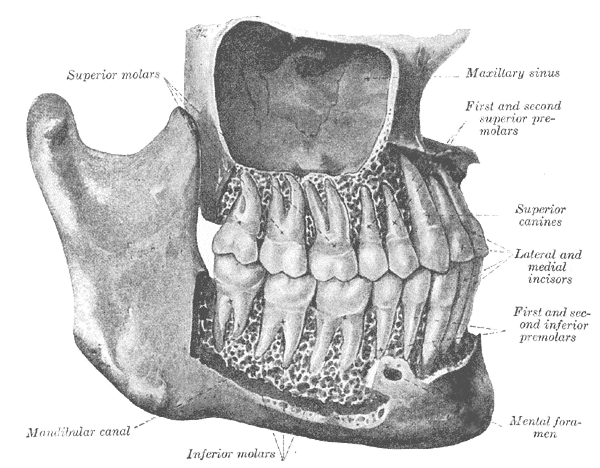
- The permanent teeth of a human, viewed from the right.

Details

Identifiers
- Latin: dens incisivus
- MeSH: D007180
- TA98: A05.1.03.004
- TA2: 906
- FMA: 12823

Incisors (from Latin incidere, "to cut") are the front teeth present in most mammals and other therapsids. They are located in the premaxilla above and on the mandible below. Humans have a total of eight (two on each side, top and bottom). Opossums have 18, whereas armadillos, anteaters and other animals in the superorder Xenarthra have none.

== Structure ==
Adult humans normally have eight incisors, two of each type. The types of incisors are:

- maxillary central incisor (upper jaw, closest to the center of the lips)
- maxillary lateral incisor (upper jaw, beside the maxillary central incisor)
- mandibular central incisor (lower jaw, closest to the center of the lips)
- mandibular lateral incisor (lower jaw, beside the mandibular central incisor)

Children with a full set of deciduous teeth (primary teeth) also have eight incisors, named the same way as in permanent teeth. Young children may have from zero to eight incisors depending on the stage of their tooth eruption and tooth development. Typically, the mandibular central incisors erupt first, followed by the maxillary central incisors, the mandibular lateral incisors and finally the maxillary laterals. The rest of the primary dentition erupts after the incisors.

Apart from the first molars, the incisors are also the first permanent teeth to erupt, following the same order as the primary teeth, among themselves.

=== Other animals ===
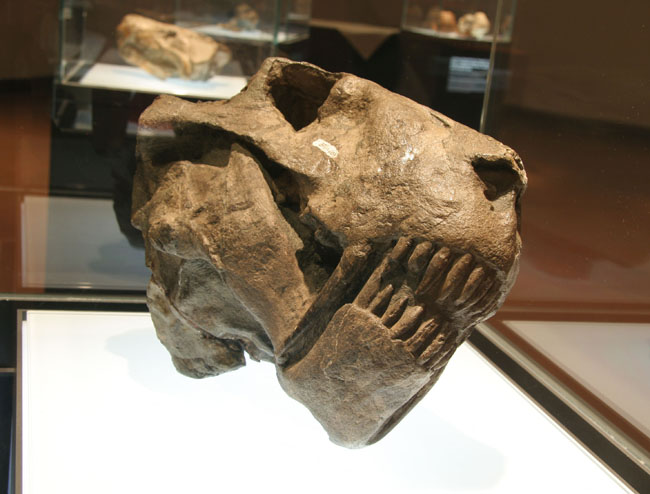
Skull of the gorgonopsian therapsid Smilesaurus, showing pronounced incisors

Distinct incisors first emerged among early therapsids during the Permian period.

Among mammals, the number varies from species to species. Opossums have 18, whereas armadillos have none. Cats, dogs, foxes, pigs, and horses have twelve. Rodents have four. Rabbits and hares (lagomorphs) were once considered rodents, but are distinguished by having six—one small pair, called "peg teeth", is located directly behind the most anterior pair. Incisors are used to bite off tough foods, such as red meat.

Cattle (cows, bulls, etc.) have none on top but a total of six on the bottom.

== Function ==
In cats, the incisors are small; biting off meat is done with the canines and the carnassials. In elephants, the upper incisors are modified into curved tusks (unlike with narwhals, where it is a canine that develops into a straight and twisted tusk). The incisors of rodents grow throughout life and are worn by gnawing. In humans, the incisors serve to cut off pieces of food, as well as in the grip of other food items.

== Additional images ==
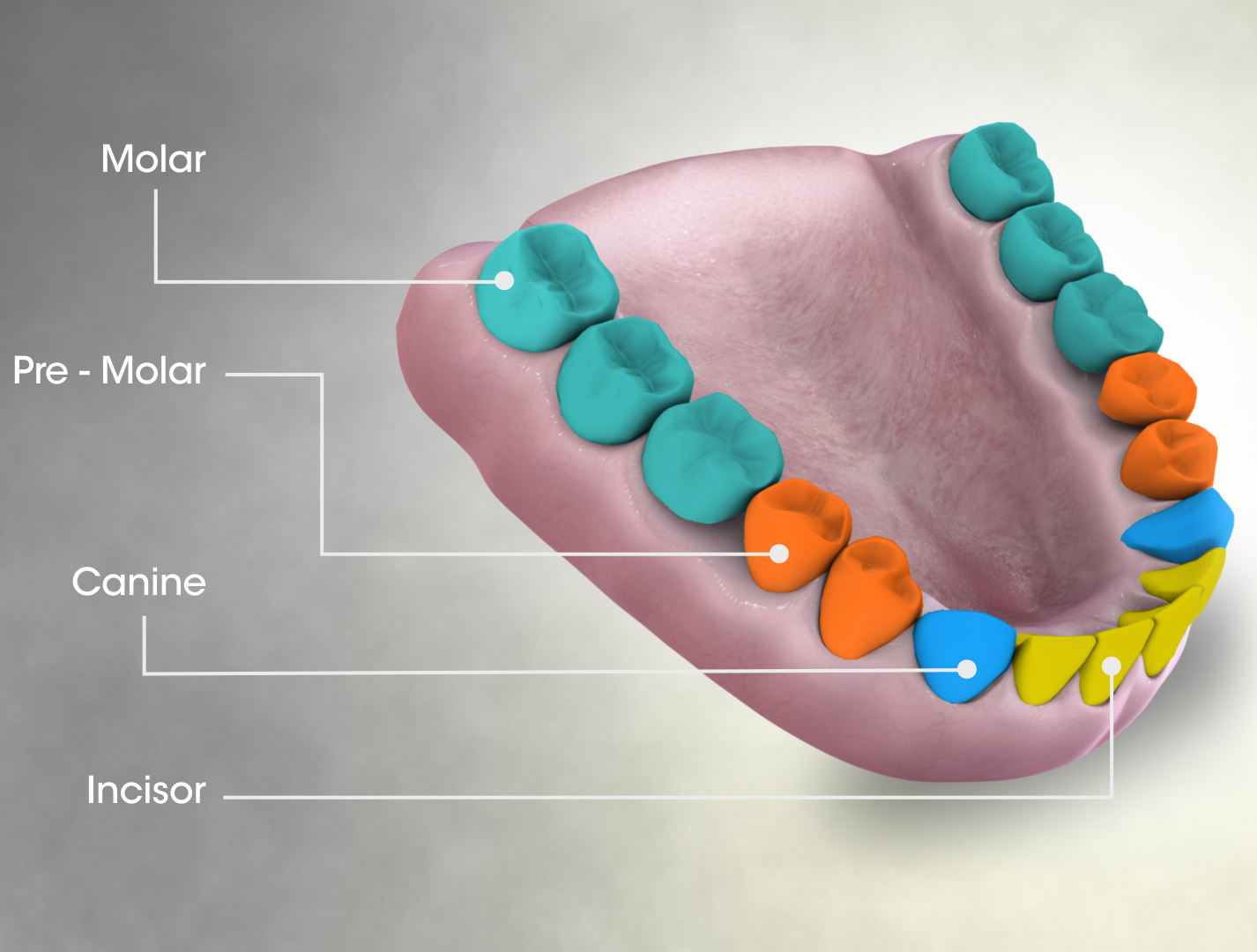
Arrangement of incisors in an adult human.

Mouth (oral cavity)

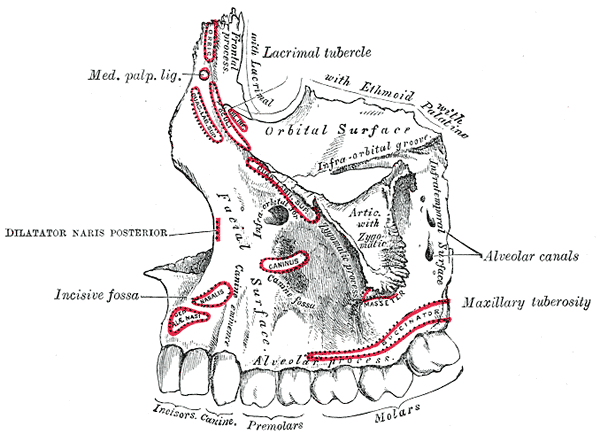
Left maxilla. Outer surface.

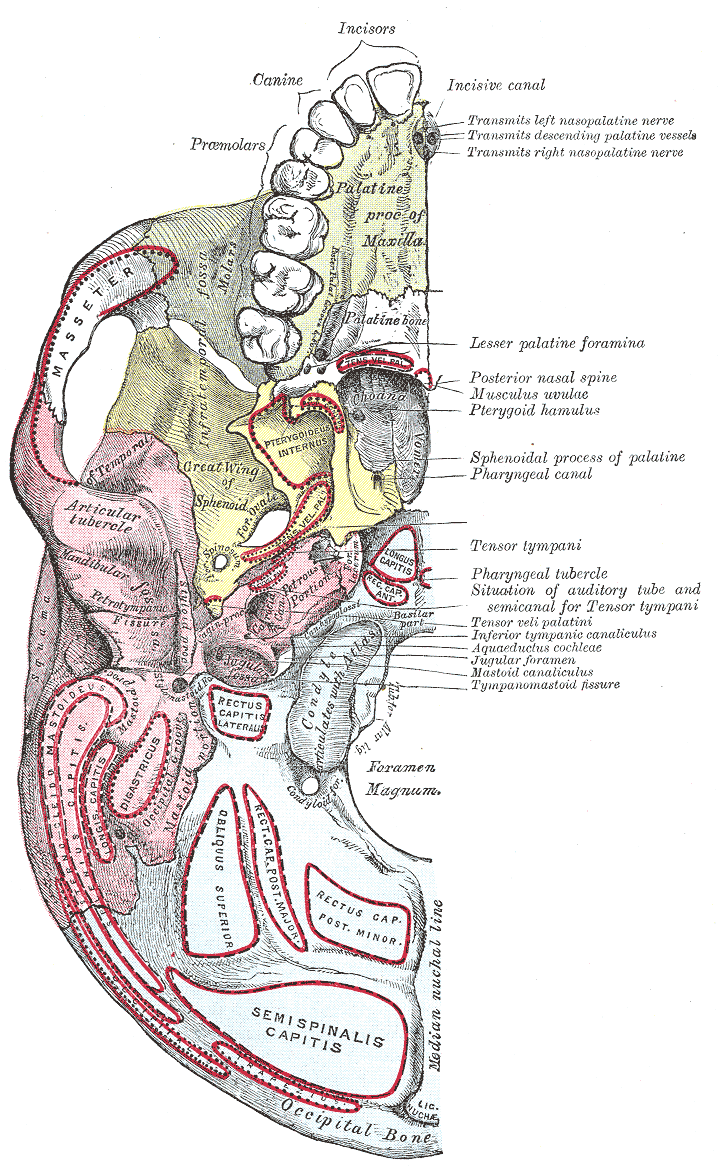
Base of skull. Inferior surface.

== See also ==
- Canine tooth
- Molar
- Premolar
- Shovel-shaped incisors
