= Shovel-shaped incisors =

Possible shape of human incisor teeth

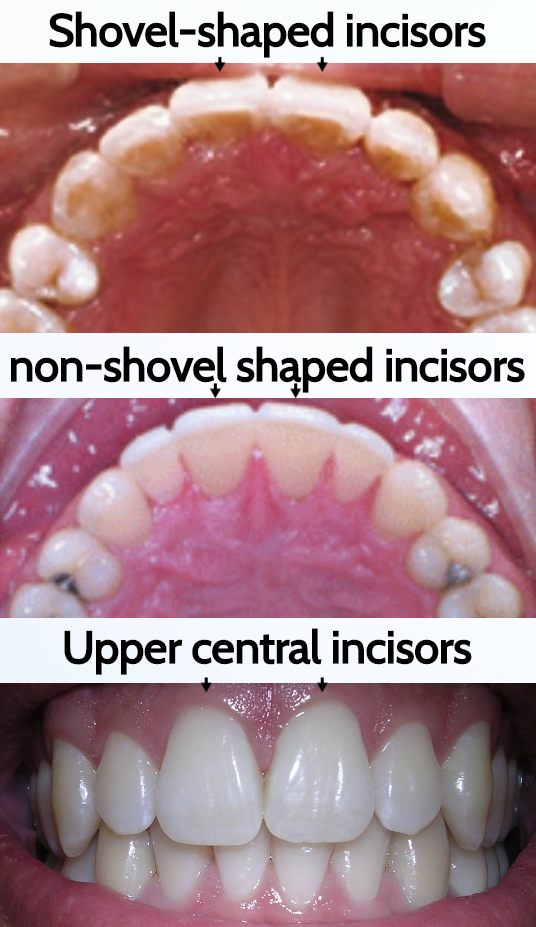
Shovel-shaped incisors and non-shovel-shaped incisors

Shovel-shaped incisors (or, more simply, shovel incisors) are incisors whose lingual surfaces are scooped as a consequence of lingual marginal ridges, crown curvature, or basal tubercles, either alone or in combination.

Shovel-shaped incisors are significantly common in Indigenous Americans from North, Central, and South America. They are also common in East Asians and Central Asians, Inuit, and Aleut peoples of Northeast Asia and North America (including but not limited to Inuit in eastern Alaska, Arctic Canada, and Greenland). In certain European and African groups, shovel-shaped upper incisors are uncommon or not present. There is a spectrum of the degree of shoveled-ness, ranging on a scale from 0 to 7, from spatulate incisors to shoveled incisors.

When present, shovel-shaped incisors can indicate correlation among populations and are considered to be one of the non-metrical traits in osteology. It is theorized that positive selection for shovel-shaped incisors over spatulate incisors occurred more commonly in cultures that used their teeth as tools, because a more shoveled shape increases structural strength.

In some instances, incisors can present a more pronounced version of this, called a double shovel-shape. Structurally resembling the shovel-shaped incisors, double shovel-shaped incisors are distinguished by a more pronounced mesial ridge compared to the distal ridge. The grades for both shovel-shaped incisors and double shovel-shaped incisors in females are significantly greater than those in males.

Shovel-shaped dental characteristics are also observed in Homo erectus, like the Peking Man, and in Neanderthals, although the morphology of these shoveled incisors is distinct from the modern human form. The morphology of Neanderthals' anterior teeth has been seen as an adaptation to the heavy use of their canines and incisors in processing and chewing food, and the use of their teeth for activities other than eating.

== Genetics ==
Variation in modern human incisor shoveling has been associated with the presence/absence of the V370A allele of the Ectodysplasin A Receptor (EDAR) gene. The EDAR V370A isoform arises from a single nucleotide polymorphism/missense mutation which changes the 370 Valine residue to an Alanine on the EDAR gene. The effect is approximately additive, where individuals with one copy of the allele have intermediate expression of shovel-shaped incisors and homozygotes have more strongly shoveled incisors. The trait is pleiotropically related to thicker and straighter hair shafts, other dental traits, sweat glands, and mammary gland ductal branching. An earlier quantitative genetic analysis of a Finnish population also revealed that inheritance of incisor shoveling is monogenic. The 1540C allele of EDAR is also strongly correlated with the presence of shovel-shaped incisors and hair thickness, as found in a study conducted on the DNA from Japanese populations. People with Amerindian or Asian ancestry have thicker and straighter hair.

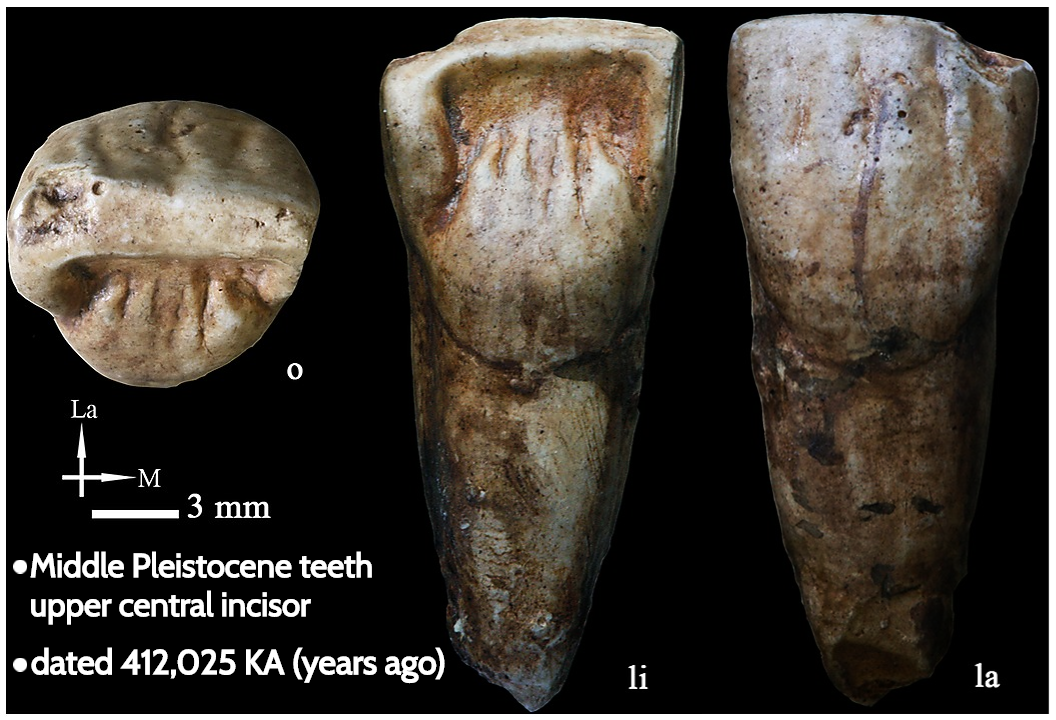
High quality replica of the right upper central incisor teeth of a Middle Pleistocene hominin.

It is hypothesized that other pleiotropic effects associated with the V370A allele were favored by natural selection to help promote the presence of the allele and thus the emergence of shovel-shaped incisors. One of these associated traits is increased ductal branching in the mammary gland, which may improve nutrient transport in breastmilk. This may likely have conferred a survival advantage to those with the allele during the Last Glacial Maximum in certain environments with high altitudes and low Vitamin D.

== History ==
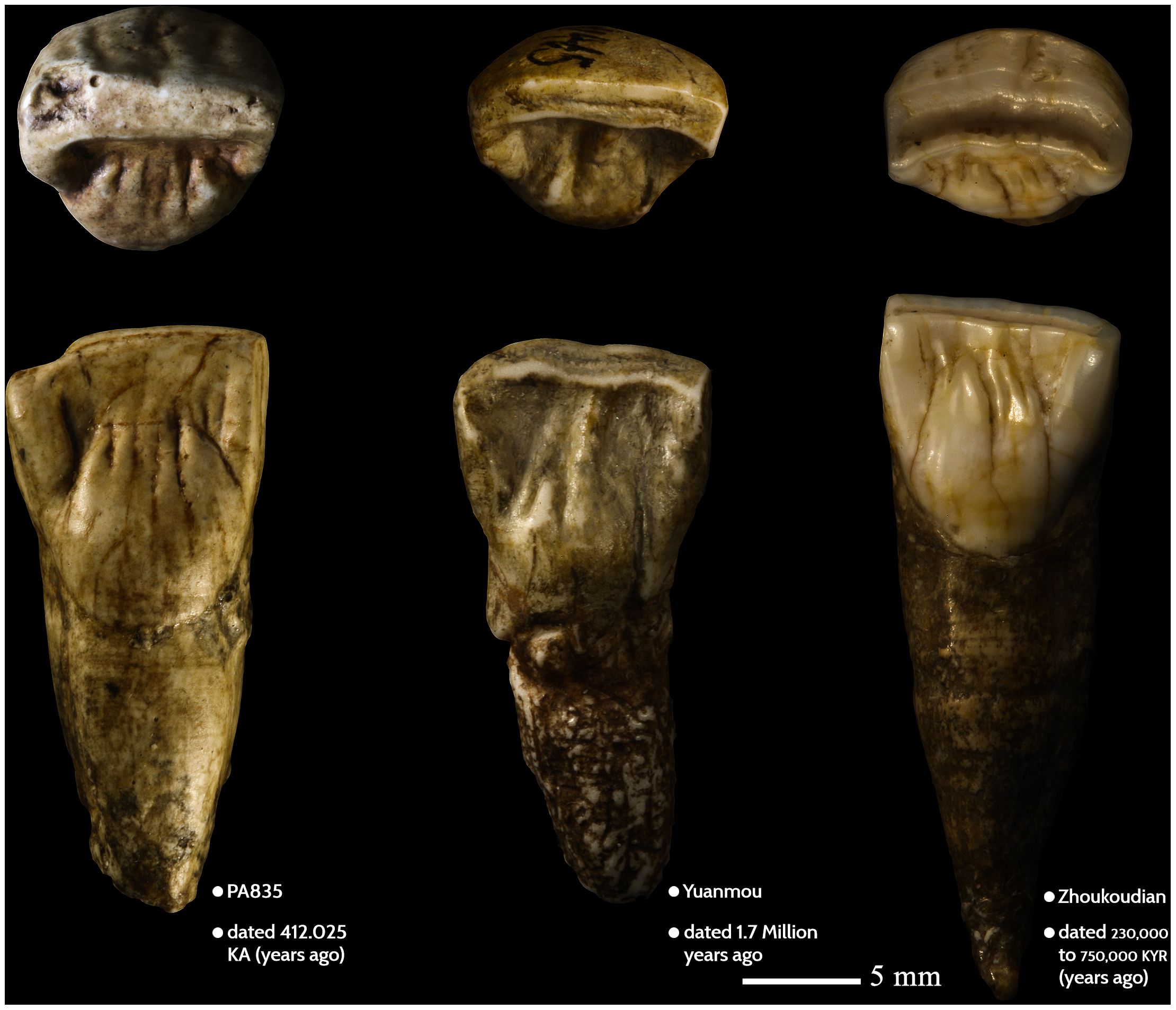
Middle Pleistocene Hominin Teeth from Longtan Cave, Hexian, China.

The first description of shovel-shaped incisors was in 1870. During the 20th century, it was accepted that incisor shoveling yielded a direct advantage to the possessor. The proposed explanation for this at the time was that shovel-shaped incisors were stronger than non-shovel shaped incisors, resulting in the evolution of shovel-shaped incisors in regions where having stronger teeth would provide an evolutionary advantage. The greater size and mass of shoveled incisors was said to have provided increased strength and durability as a means to prevent breakage. However, current research shows that part of the genotype, the EDAR gene, which may have been selected for because of its role in nutrient transfer in breast milk during the era of the Beringian refugium, also determines the degree to which teeth shovel. In an interview, Dr. Hlusko suggests that human populations who had the trait migrated from Asia to the Americas, thus leaving their genetic trace around the world. With greater implications outside shoveling itself, the human variation in shoveling also supports the idea that populations are dynamic.

== Applications ==
In the mid 20th century, shovel-shaped incisors were considered to be a trait useful for racial categorization, since the occurrence of shovel-shape incisors varies between many populations. A 1964 text said that many anthropologists at the time used the trait of shovel-shaped incisors as a diagnostic for race.

The presence of shovel-shaped incisors, among many dental characteristics, is used in forensic dentistry to identify an individual's ancestry, since this trait occurs predominantly in Asian and Native American populations.

== See also ==
- Sinodonty and Sundadonty
- Mongoloid
