= Hip (disambiguation) =

The hip is an anatomical region and a joint.

Hip or HIP may also refer to:

== Science and technology ==
- HIP, a prefix for a star in the Hipparcos Catalogue
- High-impact polystyrene (HIPS) or high-impact plastic
- Hot isostatic pressing, a heat and pressure treatment applied to metals and alloys
- Huntingtin Interacting Protein
  - Hip-1, Huntingtin Interacting Protein 1
  - HIP2, Huntingtin Interacting Protein 2, now UBE2K
  - HIP1R
- Head in pillow (metallurgy), a solder joint defect on BGAs

=== Anatomy ===
- Hip, an anatomical region and a joint
- Hip bone, in adults one of the bones of the pelvis

=== Computing ===
- Host-based intrusion-prevention system (HIPS), a computer security system
- Human interaction proof, a CAPTCHA
- Host Identity Protocol (HIP), a computer protocol
- Heterogeneous(-compute) Interface for Portability, a parallel (GPU) computing platform by AMD and an alternative to CUDA by Nvidia

== Organizations ==
- Health Insurance Plan, see Health care finance in the United States
  - Health Insurance Plan of New Jersey, a defunct Health Maintenance Organization
  - Health Insurance Plan of New York, a Health Maintenance Organization
  - Healthy Indiana Plan, a health plan in Indiana that was established by Governor Mitch Daniels
- Hillsborough Independent Panel; see Hillsborough disaster
- Helsinki Institute of Physics, Finland

== Places ==
- Highams Park railway station (National Rail station code), England
- Harlem Irving Plaza, an enclosed mall in Norridge, Illinois, commonly referred to as "The HIP"

== Music ==
- Hip (album), by the Danish band Steppeulvene
- Hip Records, a record label
- The Tragically Hip, a Canadian rock band also referred to as The Hip
- Historically informed performance, a practice of performing European classical music on period instruments
- "Hip", a single by South Korean girl group Mamamoo

== Other uses ==
- Hip Linkchain (1936–1989), American guitarist and singer
- Hypertension in Pregnancy, a medical journal
- Home Improvement Programme, in Singapore
- Home Information Pack, a set of documents about a United Kingdom residential property
- Hip (slang), a slang term meaning fashionably current
- Mil Mi-8 "Hip", a Russian helicopter
- Human Instrumentality Project, fictional term from the anime Neon Genesis Evangelion

== See also ==
- Hip roof, a component of a roof
- Rose hip, the fruit of the rose
- Hip hip hooray, a cheer
- Ontario Health Insurance Plan (OHIP)
- H!P
- H1P (disambiguation)
- HLP (disambiguation)
