= Huntingtin Interacting Protein =

Huntingtin Interacting Protein (HIP) may refer to:

- HIP1 (Huntingtin-interacting protein 1)
- HIP1R (Huntingtin-interacting protein 1 related protein)
- HIP2 (Huntingtin-interacting protein 2), current name Ubiquitin-conjugating enzyme E2 K (UBE2K)

== See also ==
- Huntingtin
