= Hipper =

Hipper may refer to:

- Admiral Hipper (disambiguation)
  - Admiral Franz von Hipper
  - German cruiser Admiral Hipper
- River Hipper, a tributary of the River Rother in Derbyshire, England

== See also ==
- Hip (disambiguation)
- Hipster (disambiguation)
