= HP1 =

HP1 or variant, may refer to:

- Heterochromatin Protein 1, an important marker molecule in epigenetic research
- The postal code for part of Hemel Hempstead in Dacorum, see HP postcode area
- hP1, a Pearson symbol
- Harry Potter and the Philosopher's Stone, the first novel in J.K. Rowling's Harry Potter series
- Harry Potter and the Philosopher's Stone (film), the first film in J.K. Rowling's Harry Potter series
- Handley Page Type A a.k.a. H.P.1, an airplane
- HP-1, a glider designed by Richard Schreder
- HP1, a type of photographic stock, see Ilford HP
- Haemophilus phage HP1, a virus
- Hp.1 (proceed), from German railway signalling

== See also ==
- HP (disambiguation)
- HPI (disambiguation)
- HPL (disambiguation)
- H1P (disambiguation)
