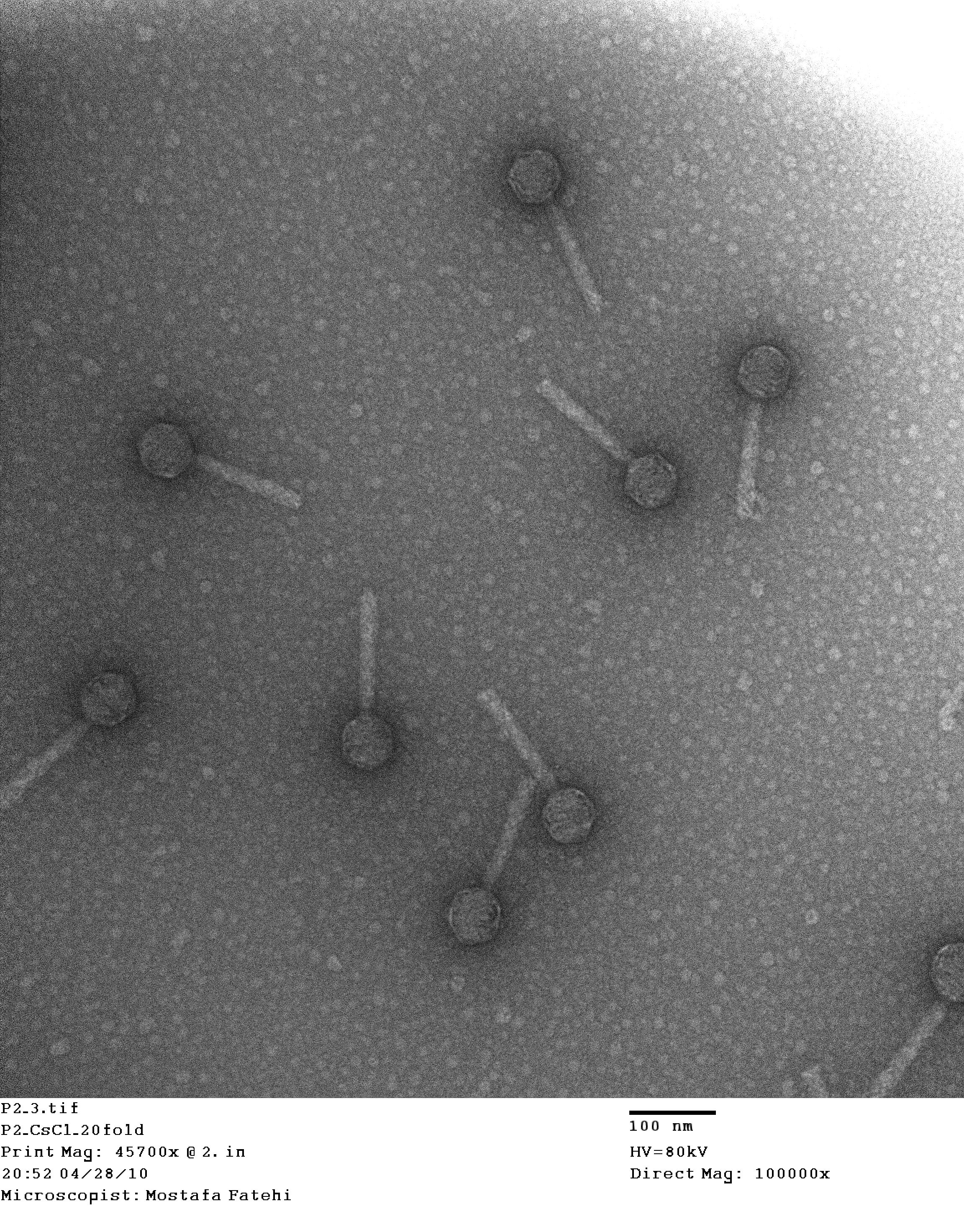
- Transmission electron micrograph of Bacteriophage P2 virions.

Virus classification
- (unranked): Virus
- Realm: Duplodnaviria
- Kingdom: Heunggongvirae
- Phylum: Uroviricota
- Class: Caudoviricetes
- Family: Peduoviridae
- Genus: Peduovirus
- Species: Peduovirus P2

Synonyms
- Escherichia virus P2

= Bacteriophage P2 =

Peduovirus P2

Species of virus

Bacteriophage P2, scientific name Peduovirus P2 (formerly Escherichia virus P2), is a temperate phage that infects E. coli. It is a tailed virus with a contractile sheath and is thus classified in the genus Peduovirus (formerly P2likevirus), family Peduoviridae within class Caudoviricetes. This genus of viruses includes many P2-like phages as well as the satellite phage P4.

== Discovery ==
Bacteriophage P2 was first isolated by G. Bertani from the Lisbonne and Carrère strain of E. coli in 1951. Since that time, a large number of P2-like prophages (e.g. 186, HP1, HK239, and WΦ) have been isolated that shared characters such as host range, serological relatedness and inability to recombine with phage λ, and they seemed to be quite common in E. coli populations as about 30% of the strains in the E. coli reference collection (SABC) contain P2-like prophages . Of these P2-like prophages is P2 best characterized. The P2 phage was found to be able to multiply in many strains of E. coli, as well as in strains of many other species including Serratia, Klebsiella pneumoniae, and Yersinia sp, which suggested that it played an important role in horizontal gene transfer in bacterial evolution.

== Genome and morphology ==
Phage P2 has a double stranded DNA genome packaged in an icosahedral capsid with a diameter of 60 nanometers that is connected to a 135 nanometer long tail. Presence of phage P4 can cause P2 to form smaller capsids. The tail ends in a baseplate which is the control hub for phage infectivity. The baseplate includes 6 tail fibers which initially bind to receptors on the bacterial cell wall and a tail spike protein that subsequently binds irreversibly to other receptors on the cell wall.

The genome of bacteriophage P2 is 33,592 bp of double-stranded, linear DNA with cohesive ends (accession number AF063097). The 42 genes in the genome can be divided in three main categories: (i) genes required for lytic growth, (ii) genes involved in establishing and maintaining lysogeny (such as int and C), and (iii) the nonessential genes (including old, tin, and Z/fun). Furthermore, a number of open reading frames (ORFs) is found in P2 genome, which may encode functional proteins.

== Life cycle ==
Bacteriophage P2 is a temperate phage, which means that it can propagate lytically (i.e. directing the host cell to produce phage progenies and finally lysing the host when the phage progenies exit), as well as establish lysogeny (i.e. injecting and fusing its genetic material into the genome of the host without lysing the cell) and maintain as a prophage in host genome.

=== Infection ===
Adsorption of the virion to the host cell is the key step in phage infection, which is essential for the following phage binding and injection of phage DNA . During the adsorption process, the tail fiber of phage P2 recognizes and binds to the core region of the lipopolysaccharide of E. coli, and then the phage would inject its DNA into the cytoplasm.

=== Lytic cycle ===
==== Early transcription ====
The gene expression of P2 is regulated over time during the lytic cycle. Early transcription, which is responsible for the expression of the genes required for the following DNA replication, is initiated immediately after infection. The early operon contains 9 genes and transcribes from the lytic promotor Pe. The first gene in the operon, designated cox, encodes the repressor of the lysogenic promoter Pc and prevent the expression of the genes required for establishing lysogeny. Then the phage enters the lytic lifecycle and early transcription starts. Only host σ^{70} RNA polymerase is required in the early transcription process.

==== DNA replication ====
Besides cox, the early operon contains two other genes which are essential for P2 DNA replication, genes A and B. Replication of P2 genome is initiated by A protein and takes place from a fixed origin (ori) via a modified rolling-circle mechanism that generates double-stranded monomeric circles. The B protein may be required for lagging-strand synthesis, as it can interact with E. coli DnaB and function as a helicase loader.

==== Activation of late transcription ====
Late gene transcription is initiated from four late promoters once DNA replication has started and the transcriptional activator Ogr has been expressed. The late promoters, P_{P}, P_{O}, P_{V} and P_{F,} are activated by Ogr and direct the transcription of the genes responsible for lytic functions as well as encoding building blocks for phage progenies. All the four promoters have a region with a partial dyad symmetry centered around 55 bp downstream from the transcriptional initiation site. Revealed by deletion analysis and base substitutions, this dyad symmetry has been shown to be essential for promoter activity. Moreover, the late genes of P2 can also be activated by the δ proteins of satellite phages P4 and ΦR73 directly.

==== Lysis ====
During the lytic cycle, similar to other double-stranded phages, bacteriophage P2 applies a holin-endolysin system to lyse the host cell. P2 have two essential lysis genes (gene K and gene Y) and two ancillary lysis genes (lysA and lysB). The product of K gene has extensive amino acid sequence similarity to that of gene R in λ phage, which exhibits endolysin function and attack the glycosidic bond. Gene Y encodes a polypeptide sharing high similarity to the holin protein family, which forms ‘holes’ in the cell membrane and provide a pathway for endolysin escape to the cell wall. The nonessential genes, lysA and lysB, seem to play a role in controlling the correct timing of lysis.

=== Lysogenic cycle ===
==== Prophage integration ====
During lysogenic cycle, P2 genome is inserted into the host chromosome and maintained as a prophage. The integration involves site-specific recombination between a bacterial attachment site (attB) and a phage attachment site (attP), which generates host-phage junctions, attL and attR. This reaction is controlled by a phage-encoded integrase, and leads to no gain or loss of nucleotides. Another integration host factor, IHF, is also essential in the integration process and serves as an architectural protein that binds and bends DNA. Thus, the integration mechanism of phage P2 is similar to the well-studied λ site-specific recombination system, but the phage proteins and their DNA binding sites differ.

==== Maintenance of lysogeny ====
The lysogenic state of P2 is promoted and maintained by the C repressor. It is a 99-amino acids polypeptide and binds to only one operator region which regulates the expression of the early genes: cox, B and possibly A. Research has shown that C repressor can both positively and negatively regulate its own Pc promoter as Pc is up regulated at low C level and down regulated at high levels. Since the C repressor is not inactivated by the SOS/RecA system of E. coli, the P2 prophage is non-inducible by ultraviolet irradiation. Furthermore, even if C repressor is inactivated, the P2 prophage is unable to excise, due to lack of int expression. Hence, P2 has been regarded as the prototype for the non-inducible class of temperate phages. The mechanism about how P2 solve the induction-excision paradox still remains unknown.

=== Control of lytic versus lysogenic growth ===
As stated before, upon infection, phage P2 can enter into either lytic or lysogenic cycle. The lytic/lysogenic decision upon infection depends on which promoter takes command, the lysogenic promoter Pc or the promoter Pe that controlled genes responsible for lytic cycle. Pc and Pe are located face-to-face, and they are mutually exclusive. The Pe promotor directs transcription of the Cox protein that represses the Pc promoter and thereby prevents lysogenization, and the Pc promoter directs the C repressor transcription which down regulates Pe. Thus, which promotor takes command is thought to be a consequence of the relative concentrations of the Cox protein and the C repressor. If the balance between the C repressor and Cox proteins is shifted towards C repressor after infection, then the phage will enter the lysogenic lifecycle as the Pe promoter will be turned off and vice versa.

== Evolution of bacteriophage P2 and other P2-like phages ==
Plenty of researches have shown that phage genomes are composed of both genes similar to host genes or other phage genes, and novel genes which show little similarity to any known genes. P2-like phage family are no exception. Their genomes share a lot of similarity but each of them contain unique genes, including some ones which functions remain unknown. Based on the criterion suggested by Ackermann, many phages can be taxonomically classified as P2-like as they share some characters with phage P2, but up to now, only 6 complete genomes are available (P2, 186, ΦCTX, HP1, HP2 and K139).

=== Phylogenetic relationship of 6 sequenced P2-like phages ===
Revealed by whole genome comparison, only nine late genes (corresponding to genes H, L, M, N, O, P, Q, S, T in phage P2) and an integrase gene were found to be both genetically similar and present in all the 6 full sequenced genomes. Phylogenetic trees based on the amino acid sequences of the 9 late gene products are constructed separately, and they all show identical topology, which suggests that they may have the same evolutionary history. Furthermore, these 9 late genes are likely to be inherited clonally as there is no indication of major recombination events between them for any pair of phages. However, for remaining genes besides these nine, their phylogenetic relationship is often ambiguous and hard to resolve their evolutionary history.

=== Homologous and non-homologous recombination ===
Homologous recombination plays a more important role in nucleotide changes of phage P2 than mutation, which is not surprising as P2-like prophages are prevalent in E. coli population and genetic exchange is found to occur between host genomes. Sequencing of five late genes from 18 isolates of P2-like phages demonstrated that homologous recombination is extensive and occurs randomly at multiple breakpoints. The genetic variations in the late genes of the 18 close relatives are small, as the greatest difference in any gene was only 3.7%. For there was much more variation in synonymous rather than nonsynonymous third-codon positions, these late genes are likely to be subject to rather strong stabilizing selection.

Besides homologous recombination between related phages, non-homologous recombination is also a key mechanism for phage evolution. The high level of similarities in the tail fiber genes of phage P2, P1, Mu, λ, K3 and T2, which belong to different families, indicates a previously unappreciated level of non-homologous recombination between unrelated phages. As host range of phage is largely determined by tail fiber, this finding suggests that under selective pressures, phages are likely to change their host range by making use of the gene pool available to them.

== Contribution to the evolution of its host ==
Capable of switching between lytic and lysogenic lifecycle is greatly beneficial for the survival of phage. In a large dense population of isogenic hosts, the lytic strategy is preferred, and phage virulence as well as host defense mechanisms will evolve in an arms race manner. On the contrary, lysogeny is favored when the host cell density is not high enough for maintenance of the phage density by repeated cycles of lytic infections.

It is well known that phage P2 has the potential to mediate horizontal gene transfer upon infection of different bacteria. During this process, phage P2 can serve as a source of new genes to the hosts, which provides materials for evolution and selection. Compared to evolution through mutation and selection, phage-mediated genetic changes can affect drastic alterations to bacterial metabolism and physiology within a short time, and they may confer fitness to their hosts. For example, Edlin et al. found that the lysogenic E. coli having a λ, P1, P2, or Mu prophage could grow more rapidly than a non-lysogenic counterpart under nutrient-limited condition. Furthermore, it was shown that P2 prophage may contribute to the dissemination of cytolethal distending toxins among E. coli O157 strains and facilitate their niche expansion among different animal hosts, which provides new insights into the pathogenesis of E. coli O157.
