= Escherichia virus Wphi =

Peduovirus Wphi

Virus classification
- (unranked): Virus
- Realm: Duplodnaviria
- Kingdom: Heunggongvirae
- Phylum: Uroviricota
- Class: Caudoviricetes
- Family: Peduoviridae
- Genus: Peduovirus
- Species: Peduovirus Wphi

Species of virus

Escherichia virus Wphi is a virus of the genus Peduovirus.

As a member of the group I of the Baltimore classification, Escherichia virus Wphi is a dsDNA virus. All peduoviruses share a nonenveloped morphology consisting of a head and a tail separated by a neck. Its genome is linear. The propagation of the virions includes the attaching to a host cell (a bacterium, as Escherichia virus Wphi is a bacteriophage) and the injection of the double stranded DNA; the host transcribes and translates it to manufacture new particles. To replicate its genetic content requires host cell DNA polymerases and, hence, the process is highly dependent on the cell cycle.
