= Enterobacteria phage P4 =

Virus classification
- (unranked): Virus
- Realm: Duplodnaviria
- Kingdom: Heunggongvirae
- Phylum: Uroviricota
- Class: Caudoviricetes
- Family: Peduoviridae
- Genus: Peduovirus
- Species: Escherichia virus P2
- Strain: Enterobacteria phage P4

Species of virus

Enterobacteria phage P4 (also known as satellite phage P4) is a temperate bacteriophage strain of species Escherichia virus P2 within genus Peduovirus (formerly P2-like viruses, P2virus, and P2likevirus), subfamily Peduovirinae, family Myoviridae. It is a satellite virus, requiring P2-related helper phage to grow lytically.

== Structure ==
The P4 virion has a tail and an icosahedral head containing a linear double-stranded DNA genome of 11,627 kb.

== Life cycle ==
Phage P4 infects Escherichia coli. It is a satellite virus which cannot engage in lytic growth without the presence of a P2-related helper phage. It generally follows a lysogenic life cycle: after infection, the P4 genome integrates into that of its host. The P4 genome can also exist on its own within the host cell and can replicate as a free plasmid.
