= Int-alpA RNA motif =

int-alpA
- Consensus secondary structure and sequence conservation of int-alpA RNA

Identifiers
- Symbol: int-alpA
- Rfam: RF02996

Other data
- RNA type: Gene; sRNA
- SO: SO:0001263
- PDB structures: PDBe

The int-alpA RNA motif is a conserved RNA structure that was discovered by bioinformatics. int-alpA motif RNAs are found in Pseudomonadota, and one example is known in each of Acidobacteriota and Planctomycetota. An int-alpA was also detected in a purified phage, specifically Thalssomonas phage BA3.

int-alpA RNAs likely function in trans as small RNAs. They are often located nearby to integrase genes that most resemble the homologous gene found in the P4 phage. int-alpA RNAs also often occur nearby to alpA genes, a gene that is also related to phages. Thus the RNA motif seems to function as part of phages.
