= Yersinia virus L413C =

Virus classification
- (unranked): Virus
- Realm: Duplodnaviria
- Kingdom: Heunggongvirae
- Phylum: Uroviricota
- Class: Caudoviricetes
- Family: Peduoviridae
- Genus: Peduovirus
- Species: Peduovirus L413C

Species of virus

Yersinia virus L413C is a virus of the genus Peduovirus.

As a member of the group I of the Baltimore classification, Yersinia virus L413C is a dsDNA virus. Peduoviruses share a nonenveloped morphology consisting of a head and a tail separated by a neck. Its genome is linear. The propagation of the virions includes the attaching to a host cell (a bacterium, as Yersinia virus L413C is a bacteriophage) and the injection of the double stranded DNA; the host transcribes and translates it to manufacture new particles. To replicate its genetic content requires host cell DNA polymerases and, hence, the process is highly dependent on the cell cycle.

The protein H of the tail fiber of Yersinia virus L413C permits the differentiation between Yersinia pestis and Y. pseudotuberculosis.
