= Burkholderia virus phiE122 =

Duodecimduovirus phiE122

Virus classification
- Missing taxonomy template (fix): Duodecimduovirus
- Species: Duodecimduovirus phiE122

Species of virus

Burkholderia virus phiE122 is a bacteriophage (a virus that infects bacteria) of the family Peduoviridae, genus Duodecimduovirus. Its genetic structure corresponds to the class I of the Baltimore classification: dsDNA, being a DNA virus.
