= Haemophilus virus HP1 =

Virus classification
- (unranked): Virus
- Realm: Duplodnaviria
- Kingdom: Heunggongvirae
- Phylum: Uroviricota
- Class: Caudoviricetes
- Family: Peduoviridae
- Genus: Hpunavirus
- Species: Hpunavirus HP1

Species of virus

Haemophilus virus HP1 is a virus of the family Peduoviridae, in the genus Hpunavirus.
