= HPL =

HPL may refer to:

== Businesses ==
- Haldia Petrochemicals Limited, an Indian petrochemical company
- Hutchison Property Limited, now Hutchison Whampoa Property, a property developer in Hong Kong
- Hindustan Prefab Limited, a project of the Indian Ministry of Housing and Urban Poverty Alleviation

== Libraries ==
- City of Hialeah Public Library, in Florida, United States
- Hamilton Public Library (Ontario), in Canada
- Hartford Public Library, in Connecticut, United States
- Hershey Public Library, in Pennsylvania, United States
- Houston Public Library, in Texas, United States

== Other uses ==
- HPL (programming language), for HP programmable calculators
- HPL Engine, a series of game engines
  - HPL Engine 1
  - HPL Engine 2
  - HPL Engine 3
- Hartlepool railway station, England, station code
- Hermanos de Pistoleros Latinos, a Hispanic-American prison gang
- High-pressure laminate, a composite material
- Hockey Premier League, a proposed international league
- Human placental lactogen (hPL), a hormone
- High-performance low-power, a TSMC semiconductor wafer type
- HPL (benchmark), an implementation of the LINPACK computing benchmark
- H. P. Lovecraft (1890–1937), American author
