= PRPF40A =

Protein-coding gene in the species Homo sapiens

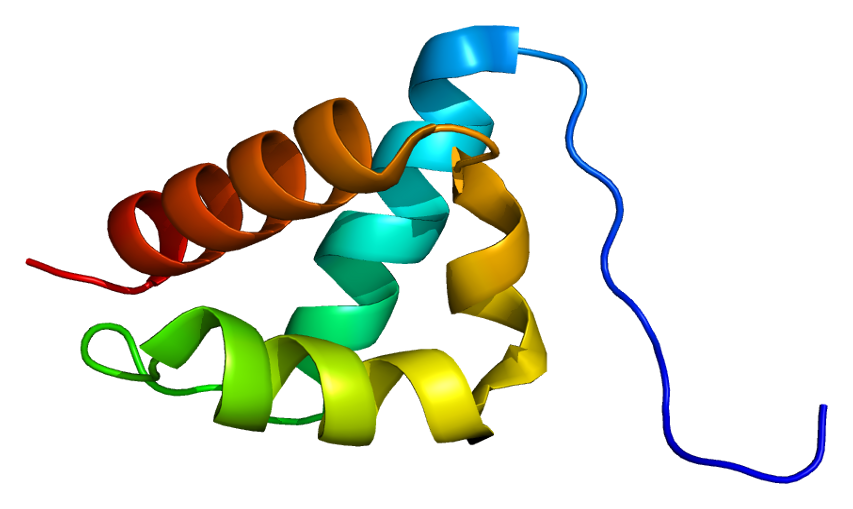

Identifiers
- Aliases: PRPF40A, FBP-11, FBP11, FLAF1, FNBP3, HIP-10, HIP10, HYPA, NY-REN-6, Prp40, pre-mRNA processing factor 40 homolog A
- External IDs: OMIM: 612941; MGI: 1860512; GeneCards: PRPF40A
Available structures
PDB	Ortholog search: PDBe RCSB
PDB	List of PDB id codes 1UZC, 1YWI, 1YWJ, 1ZR7, 2CQN, 2DYF, 2KZG, 2L5F, 2L9V, 2LKS

Gene location (Human)
Chr.	Chromosome 2 (human)
Band	2q23.3	Start	152,651,593 bp
Band	2q23.3	End	152,718,012 bp

Gene location (Mouse)
Chr.	Chromosome 2 (mouse)
Band	2|2 C1.1	Start	53,134,704 bp
Band	2|2 C1.1	End	53,191,284 bp
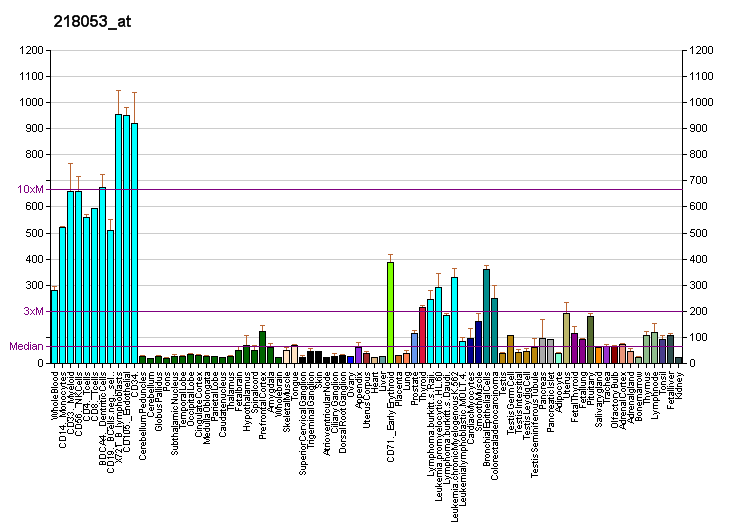

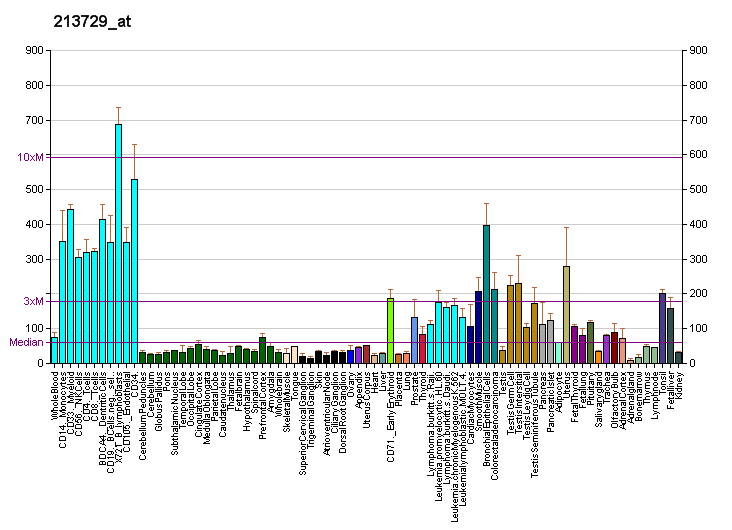

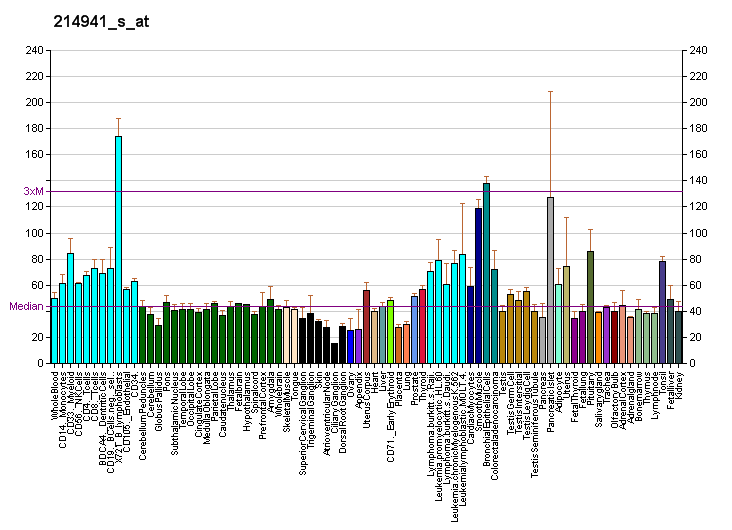
RNA expression pattern
Bgee	Human / Mouse (ortholog); Top expressed in: secondary oocyte; caput epididymis; corpus epididymis; tail of epididymis; Achilles tendon; epithelium of nasopharynx; trabecular bone; mucosa of paranasal sinus; oral cavity; visceral pleura / Top expressed in: tail of embryo; genital tubercle; spermatid; spermatocyte; ventricular zone; Rostral migratory stream; zygote; abdominal wall; embryo; epiblast; More reference expression data
BioGPS	More reference expression data
Gene ontology
Molecular function	proline-rich region binding; protein binding; RNA binding
Cellular component	nuclear matrix; U1 snRNP; U2-type prespliceosome; membrane; nucleus; nucleoplasm; cytosol; nuclear speck
Biological process	cell division; cell cycle; mRNA processing; regulation of cytokinesis; cell migration; cytoskeleton organization; RNA splicing; regulation of cell shape; mRNA splicing, via spliceosome; mRNA cis splicing, via spliceosome
Sources:Amigo / QuickGO
Orthologs
Databases	NCBI: entry; OMA: entry
Species	Human	Mouse
Entrez	55660	56194
Ensembl	ENSG00000196504	ENSMUSG00000061136
UniProt	O75400	Q9R1C7
RefSeq (mRNA)	NM_017892; NM_001354432; NM_001354431; NM_001365596; NM_001365597 NM_001365598; NM_001365599; NM_001365600; NM_001365601; NM_001365602; NM_001365603; NM_001365604; NM_001365605; NM_001395472; NM_001395473; NM_001395475; NM_001395476; NM_001395477; NM_001395478; NM_001395479; NM_001395480; NM_001395481; NM_001395482; NM_001395483; NM_001395488	NM_018785
RefSeq (protein)	NP_060362; NP_001341361; NP_001341360; NP_001352525; NP_001352526 NP_001352527; NP_001352528; NP_001352529; NP_001352530; NP_001352531; NP_001352532; NP_001352533; NP_001352534	NP_061255; NP_001357944; NP_001357945; NP_001357946; NP_001357947 NP_001357948; NP_001357949
Location (UCSC)	Chr 2: 152.65 – 152.72 Mb	Chr 2: 53.13 – 53.19 Mb
PubMed search
- Wikidata
View/Edit Human	View/Edit Mouse

Pre-mRNA-processing factor 40 homolog A is a protein that in humans is encoded by the PRPF40A gene.

== Interactions ==
PRPF40A has been shown to interact with Huntingtin.
