= Huntingtin =

Gene and protein involved in Huntington's disease

HTT
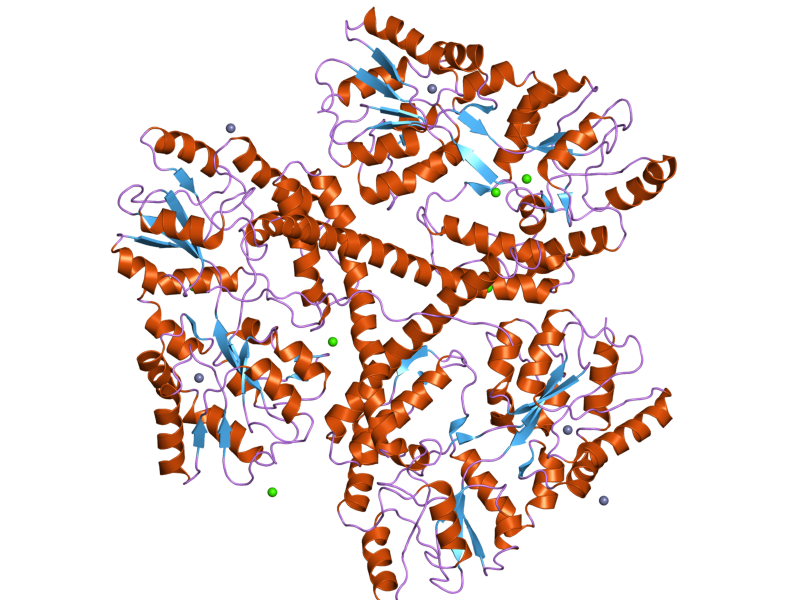

Identifiers
- Aliases: HTT, HD, IT15, huntingtin, LOMARS
- External IDs: OMIM: 613004; MGI: 96067; GeneCards: HTT
Available structures
PDB	Ortholog search: PDBe RCSB
PDB	List of PDB id codes 3IO6, 3IOU, 3LRH, 4FE8, 4FEB, 4FEC, 4FED, 2LD0, 2LD2, 3IO4, 3IOR, 3IOT, 3IOV, 3IOW, 4RAV

Gene location (Human)
Chr.	Chromosome 4 (human)
Band	4p16.3	Start	3,041,363 bp
Band	4p16.3	End	3,243,957 bp

Gene location (Mouse)
Chr.	Chromosome 5 (mouse)
Band	5 B2|5 17.92 cM	Start	34,919,084 bp
Band	5 B2|5 17.92 cM	End	35,069,878 bp
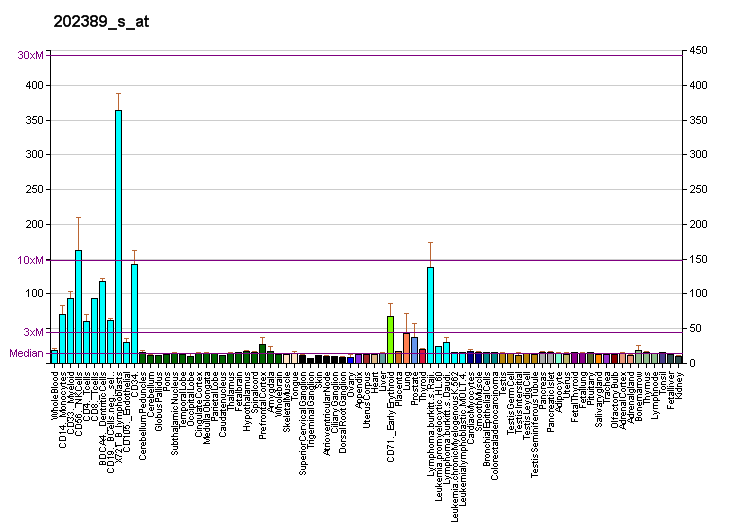
RNA expression pattern
Bgee	Human / Mouse (ortholog); Top expressed in: sural nerve; body of pancreas; epithelium of colon; granulocyte; stromal cell of endometrium; Achilles tendon; ventricular zone; muscle of thigh; skin of leg; skin of abdomen / Top expressed in: Ileal epithelium; perirhinal cortex; entorhinal cortex; Rostral migratory stream; CA3 field; lactiferous gland; mammillary body; superior colliculus; primary motor cortex; Paneth cell; More reference expression data
BioGPS	More reference expression data
Gene ontology
Molecular function	profilin binding; dynactin binding; transmembrane transporter binding; p53 binding; transcription factor binding; protein binding; beta-tubulin binding; identical protein binding; dynein intermediate chain binding; kinase binding; heat shock protein binding
Cellular component	late endosome; Golgi apparatus; nucleoplasm; autophagosome; endoplasmic reticulum; centriole; cytoplasmic vesicle membrane; dendrite; cytosol; axon; nucleus; cytoplasm; inclusion body; perinuclear region of cytoplasm; protein-containing complex; presynaptic cytosol; postsynaptic cytosol
Biological process	animal organ development; retrograde vesicle-mediated transport, Golgi to endoplasmic reticulum; Golgi organization; vesicle transport along microtubule; negative regulation of extrinsic apoptotic signaling pathway; establishment of mitotic spindle orientation; positive regulation of cilium assembly; positive regulation of inositol 1,4,5-trisphosphate-sensitive calcium-release channel activity; apoptotic process; vocal learning; positive regulation of lipophagy; positive regulation of autophagy of mitochondrion; positive regulation of aggrephagy; regulation of phosphoprotein phosphatase activity; protein destabilization; positive regulation of apoptotic process; regulation of CAMKK-AMPK signaling cascade; regulation of cAMP-dependent protein kinase activity
Sources:Amigo / QuickGO
Orthologs
Databases	NCBI: entry; OMA: entry
Species	Human	Mouse
Entrez	3064	15194
Ensembl	ENSG00000197386	ENSMUSG00000029104
UniProt	P42858	P42859
RefSeq (mRNA)	NM_002111; NM_001388492	NM_010414
RefSeq (protein)	NP_002102	NP_034544
Location (UCSC)	Chr 4: 3.04 – 3.24 Mb	Chr 5: 34.92 – 35.07 Mb
PubMed search
- Wikidata
View/Edit Human	View/Edit Mouse

Huntingtin (Htt) is a human protein encoded by the HTT gene, also known as IT15 ("interesting transcript 15"). Pathogenic expansions in HTT (disease-causing repeat length increases) cause Huntington's disease (HD), and the protein has also been implicated in mechanisms of long-term memory storage.

HTT is expressed in many tissues, with the highest levels in the brain. Expression is developmentally regulated and required for embryogenesis. Huntingtin normally consists of 3,144 amino acids and has a predicted mass of ~350 kDa, depending on the length of its polyglutamine tract. Polymorphisms in HTT alter the number of glutamine residues: the wild-type allele encodes 6–35 repeats, whereas pathogenic expansions in HD exceed 36, with severe juvenile cases reaching ~250 repeats. The name huntingtin reflects this association with disease; IT15 was its earlier designation.

The molecular functions of huntingtin are not fully defined, but the protein is essential for neuronal survival and development. It is thought to contribute to intracellular signaling pathways, axonal transport, and vesicle trafficking, as well as to mediate protein–protein interactions. Huntingtin has also been shown to exert protective effects against apoptosis. Experimental disruption of HTT in model organisms results in embryonic lethality, underscoring its critical role in development. Expanded polyglutamine tracts in huntingtin cause toxic gain-of-function effects leading to Huntington's disease, an autosomal dominant neurodegenerative disease. The pathogenic protein aggregates in neurons, disrupting cellular processes and ultimately causing cell death.

== Gene ==
The 5'-end (five prime end) of the HTT gene has a sequence of three DNA bases, cytosine-adenine-guanine (CAG), coding for the amino acid glutamine, that is repeated multiple times. This region is called a trinucleotide repeat. The usual CAG repeat count is between seven and 35 repeats.

The HTT gene is located on the short arm (p) of chromosome 4 at position 16.3, from base pair 3,074,510 to base pair 3,243,960.

== Structure ==
The Huntingtin (HTT) protein is a large, predominantly α-helical molecule composed of 3,144 amino acids and weighing approximately 348kDa in its canonical form. Its structure is organized into three major domains: the amino-terminal domain, the carboxy-terminal domain, and a smaller bridge domain that connects the two. Both the amino- and carboxy-terminal regions are characterized by multiple HEAT repeats (named for Huntingtin, Elongation factor 3, Protein phosphatase 2A, and lipid kinase TOR), which are arranged in a solenoid or superhelical fashion and play a crucial role in mediating protein-protein interactions. The bridge domain contains various types of tandem repeats and helps maintain the structural connection between the larger domains. The highly variable N-terminal segment of huntingtin contains the polyglutamine (polyQ) tract—expanded in Huntington's disease—which is often intrinsically disordered and not fully resolved in high-resolution structures. Huntingtin's flexible, extended architecture is stabilized when complexed with HAP40, a partner protein, allowing the protein to function as a scaffold and interaction hub in the cell.

In recent years, multiple research groups have managed to resolve the 3D structure of full-size HTT using cryogenic electron microscopy cryoEM. This revealed the 3D architecture of the various helical HEAT repeat domains that make up the protein's native fold, as illustrated in the figure to right. However, up to 25% of the protein chain was not visible in the structure, due to flexibility. This notably included the N-terminal region affected by mutations in Huntington's disease, as discussed below.

== Function ==
The function of huntingtin (Htt) is not well understood but it is involved in axonal transport. Huntingtin is essential for development, and its absence is lethal in mice. The protein has no sequence homology with other proteins and is highly expressed in neurons and testes in humans and rodents. Huntingtin upregulates the expression of brain-derived neurotrophic factor (BDNF) at the transcription level, but the mechanism by which huntingtin regulates gene expression has not been determined. From immunohistochemistry, electron microscopy, and subcellular fractionation studies of the molecule, it has been found that huntingtin is primarily associated with vesicles and microtubules. These appear to indicate a functional role in cytoskeletal anchoring or transport of mitochondria. The Htt protein is involved in vesicle trafficking as it interacts with HIP1, a clathrin-binding protein, to mediate endocytosis, the trafficking of materials into a cell. Huntingtin has also been shown to have a role in the establishment in epithelial polarity through its interaction with RAB11A.

=== Interactions ===
Huntingtin has been found to interact directly with at least 19 other proteins, of which six are used for transcription, four for transport, three for cell signalling, and six others of unknown function (HIP5, HIP11, HIP13, HIP15, HIP16, and CGI-125). Over 100 interacting proteins have been found, such as huntingtin-associated protein 1 (HAP1) and huntingtin interacting protein 1 (HIP1), these were typically found using two-hybrid screening and confirmed using immunoprecipitation.

Interacting Protein	PolyQ length dependence	Function
α-adaptin C/HYPJ	Yes	Endocytosis
Akt/PKB	No	Kinase
CBP	Yes	Transcriptional co-activator with acetyltransferase activity
CA150	No	Transcriptional activator
CIP4	Yes	cdc42-dependent signal transduction
CtBP	Yes	Transcription factor
FIP2	Not known	Cell morphogenesis
Grb2	Not known	Growth factor receptor binding protein
HAP1	Yes	Membrane trafficking
HAP40 (F8A1, F8A2, F8A3)	Not known	Unknown
HIP1	Yes	Endocytosis, proapoptotic
HIP14/HYP-H	Yes	Trafficking, endocytosis
N-CoR	Yes	Nuclear receptor co-repressor
NF-κB	Not known	Transcription factor
p53	No	Transcription factor
PACSIN1	Yes	Endocytosis, actin cytoskeleton
DLG4 (PSD-95)	Yes	Postsynaptic Density 95
RASA1 (RasGAP)	Not known	Ras GTPase activating protein
SH3GL3	Yes	Endocytosis
SIN3A	Yes	Transcriptional repressor
Sp1	Yes	Transcription factor

Huntingtin has also been shown to interact with:

- UBE2K,
- MAP3K10,
- OPTN,
- PRPF40A,
- SETD2,
- TRIP10,
- ZDHHC17.

== Clinical significance ==
=== Huntington's disease ===
Classification of the trinucleotide repeat, and resulting disease status, depends on the number of CAG repeats
Repeat count	Classification	Disease status
<26	Normal	Unaffected
27–35	Intermediate	Unaffected
36–40	Reduced penetrance	+/- Affected
>40	Full penetrance	Affected

Huntington's disease (HD) is caused by a mutated form of the huntingtin gene, where excessive (more than 36) CAG repeats result in formation of an unstable protein. These expanded repeats lead to production of a huntingtin protein that contains an abnormally long polyglutamine tract at the N-terminus. This makes it part of a class of neurodegenerative disorders known as trinucleotide repeat disorders or polyglutamine disorders. The key sequence which is found in Huntington's disease is a trinucleotide repeat expansion of glutamine residues beginning at the 18th amino acid. In unaffected individuals, this contains between 9 and 35 glutamine residues with no adverse effects. However, 36 or more residues produce an erroneous mutant form of Htt, (mHtt). Reduced penetrance is found in counts 36–39.

N-terminal fragments of mHtt have been discovered in Huntington's disease patients. These fragments can be generated by protease enzymes that cut this elongated protein into fragments. Moreover, recent research has identified aberrant splicing to affect the mutant gene products, yielding fragments that coincide with the first exon of the protein. These protein fragments are observed to form abnormal clumps, known as neuronal intranuclear inclusions (NIIs), inside nerve cells, and may attract other, normal proteins into the clumps. The characteristic presence of these clumps in patients was thought to contribute to the development of Huntington disease. However, later research raised questions about the role of the inclusions (clumps) by showing the presence of visible NIIs extended the life of neurons and acted to reduce intracellular mutant huntingtin in neighboring neurons. One confounding factor is that different types of aggregates are now recognised to be formed by the mutant protein, including protein deposits that are too small to be recognised as visible deposits in the above-mentioned studies. The likelihood of neuronal death remains difficult to predict. Likely multiple factors are important, including: (1) the length of CAG repeats in the huntingtin gene and (2) the neuron's exposure to diffuse intracellular mutant huntingtin protein. NIIs (protein clumping) can be helpful as a coping mechanism—and not simply a pathogenic mechanism—to stem neuronal death by decreasing the amount of diffuse huntingtin. This process is particularly likely to occur in the striatum (a part of the brain that coordinates movement) primarily, and the frontal cortex (a part of the brain that controls thinking and emotions). Further, it is possible the pathogenic mechanism lay more with the RNA transcripts and their potential CAG repeats to exhibit RNAi than with the actual huntingtin protein itself.

People with 36 to 40 CAG repeats may or may not develop the signs and symptoms of Huntington disease, while people with more than 40 repeats will develop the disorder during a normal lifetime. When there are more than 60 CAG repeats, the person develops a severe form of HD known as juvenile HD. Therefore, the number of CAG (the sequence coding for the amino acid glutamine) repeats influences the age of onset of the disease. No case of HD has been diagnosed with a count less than 36.

As the altered gene is passed from one generation to the next, the size of the CAG repeat expansion can change; it often increases in size, especially when it is inherited from the father. People with 28 to 35 CAG repeats have not been reported to develop the disorder, but their children are at risk of having the disease if the repeat expansion increases.

In the pathogenesis of the disease, there is further somatic expansion of CAG repeats. It takes decades to reach 80 repeats, then years to reach 150 repeats. Beyond 150, cellular toxicity start to manifest. Over months, the neuron slowly loses its cell identity until cell death pathways are activated.

=== Mitochondrial dysfunction ===
Huntingtin is a scaffolding protein in the ATM oxidative DNA damage response complex. Mutant huntingtin (mHtt) plays a key role in mitochondrial dysfunction involving the inhibition of mitochondrial electron transport, inhibition of mitochondrial import processes, higher levels of reactive oxygen species and increased oxidative stress. The promotion of oxidative damage to DNA may contribute to Huntington's disease pathology.

== See also ==
- Votoplam
