= HLP =

HLP may refer to:

- Halim Perdanakusuma International Airport, in East Jakarta, Indonesia, IATA code
- Haryana Lokhit Party, a political party; see Haryana Legislative Assembly
- Hepatocyte growth factor-like protein
- Houston Lighting & Power, HL&P, former Texas, US utility
- Huntington Library Press, an American publisher
- .hlp, a file extension for several help file types, including WinHelp

== See also ==
- Help (disambiguation)
- HIP (disambiguation)
- H1P (disambiguation)
- H!P
