= H1P =

H1P may refer to:

- H1P, a postal code in Canada covering Montreal
- H1P, an alias of the ITIH1 protein

== See also ==
- H!P
- HIP (disambiguation)
- HLP (disambiguation)
- HP (disambiguation)
- HP1 (disambiguation)
