= Mannheimia virus PHL101 =

Baylorvirus PHL101

Virus classification
- (unranked): Virus
- Realm: Duplodnaviria
- Kingdom: Heunggongvirae
- Phylum: Uroviricota
- Class: Caudoviricetes
- Family: Peduoviridae
- Genus: Baylorvirus
- Species: Baylorvirus PHL101

Species of virus

Mannheimia virus PHL101 is a virus of the family Peduoviridae, genus Baylorvirus.

As a member of the group I of the Baltimore classification, Mannheimia virus PHL101 is a dsDNA virus. All peduoviruses share a nonenveloped morphology consisting of a head and a tail separated by a neck. Its genome is linear. The propagation of the virions includes the attaching to a host cell (a bacterium, as Mannheimia virus PHL101 is a bacteriophage) and the injection of the double stranded DNA; the host transcribes and translates it to manufacture new particles. To replicate its genetic content requires host cell DNA polymerases and, hence, the process is highly dependent on the cell cycle.

Mannheimia virus PHL101 is a lysogenic phage. Its genome contains 34,525 base pairs and 50 open reading frames.
