= Huntingtin-associated protein 1 =

Protein-coding gene in the species Homo sapiens

HAP1

Identifiers
- Aliases: HAP1, HAP2, HIP5, HLP, hHLP1, huntingtin-associated protein 1, huntingtin associated protein 1
- External IDs: OMIM: 600947; MGI: 1261831; GeneCards: HAP1

Gene location (Human)
| Chr. | Chromosome 17 (human) |
| Band | 17q21.2 | Start | 41,717,742 bp |
| Band | 17q21.2 | End | 41,734,644 bp |

Gene location (Mouse)
| Chr. | Chromosome 11 (mouse) |
| Band | 11 63.47 cM|11 D | Start | 100,238,153 bp |
| Band | 11 63.47 cM|11 D | End | 100,246,954 bp |
RNA expression pattern
| Bgee | Human / Mouse (ortholog); Top expressed in: hypothalamus; secondary oocyte; amygdala; nucleus accumbens; cingulate gyrus; anterior cingulate cortex; caudate nucleus; gonad; right frontal lobe; triceps brachii muscle / Top expressed in: dorsomedial hypothalamic nucleus; ventromedial nucleus; paraventricular nucleus of hypothalamus; arcuate nucleus; median eminence; entorhinal cortex; anterior amygdaloid area; lateral hypothalamus; dentate gyrus of hippocampal formation granule cell; central gray substance of midbrain; More reference expression data |
| BioGPS | n/a |
Gene ontology
| Molecular function | brain-derived neurotrophic factor binding; transmembrane transporter binding; protein binding; signaling receptor binding; myosin binding |
| Cellular component | cytoplasm; centrosome; cell projection; synaptic vesicle; synapse; autophagosome; axon; cell junction; endoplasmic reticulum; mitochondrion; actin cytoskeleton; inclusion body; centriole; lysosome; cytoskeleton; cytoplasmic vesicle; nucleus; axon cytoplasm; dendrite; dendrite cytoplasm |
| Biological process | protein localization; retrograde axonal transport; neurogenesis; neurotrophin TRK receptor signaling pathway; vesicle transport along microtubule; negative regulation of amyloid-beta formation; positive regulation of neurotrophin production; hypothalamus cell differentiation; positive regulation of synaptic transmission, GABAergic; cerebellum development; anterograde axonal transport; autophagy; regulation of exocytosis; positive regulation of neurogenesis; positive regulation of non-motile cilium assembly; brain development; cell projection organization; protein transport; regulation of organelle transport along microtubule; positive regulation of inositol 1,4,5-trisphosphate-sensitive calcium-release channel activity; positive regulation of epidermal growth factor receptor signaling pathway; exocytosis; chemical synaptic transmission; protein targeting; mitochondrion distribution; anterograde axonal transport of mitochondrion |
Sources:Amigo / QuickGO
Orthologs
| Databases | NCBI: entry; OMA: entry |
| Species | Human | Mouse |
| Entrez | 9001 | 15114 |
| Ensembl | ENSG00000173805 | ENSMUSG00000006930 |
| UniProt | P54257 | O35668 |
| RefSeq (mRNA) | NM_177977; NM_001079870; NM_001079871; NM_003949; NM_001367459 NM_001367460; NM_001367461; NM_001367462 | NM_010404; NM_177981; NM_001359052 |
| RefSeq (protein) | NP_001073339; NP_001073340; NP_817084; NP_001354388; NP_001354389 NP_001354390; NP_001354391 | NP_034534; NP_817090; NP_001345981 |
| Location (UCSC) | Chr 17: 41.72 – 41.73 Mb | Chr 11: 100.24 – 100.25 Mb |
| PubMed search |
- Wikidata
| View/Edit Human | View/Edit Mouse |

huntingtin-associated protein 1 (neuroan 1)

Identifiers
- Symbol: HAP1
- Alt. symbols: HAP2
- NCBI gene: 9001
- HGNC: 4812
- OMIM: 600947
- RefSeq: NM_003949
- UniProt: P54257

Other data
- Locus: Chr. 17 q21.2-21.3
Search for
- Structures: Swiss-model
- Domains: InterPro

Huntingtin-associated protein 1 (HAP1) is a protein which in humans is encoded by the HAP1 gene. This protein was found to bind to the mutant huntingtin protein (mHtt) in proportion to the number of glutamines present in the glutamine repeat region.

Huntington's disease (HD), a neurodegenerative disorder characterized by loss of striatal neurons, is caused by an expansion of a polyglutamine tract in the HD protein huntingtin. This gene encodes a protein that interacts with huntingtin, with two cytoskeletal proteins (dynactin and pericentriolar autoantigen protein 1), and with a hepatocyte growth factor-regulated tyrosine kinase substrate (HGS). The interactions with cytoskeletal proteins and a kinase substrate suggest a role for this protein in vesicular trafficking or organelle transport.

== Variants ==
Huntingtin-associated protein 1 has two subtypes; HAP1A and HAP1B.

== Function ==
HAP1 preferentially interacts with muHtt in a polyQ dependent manner. Its localization and possible interacting partners (other than Htt) have since been characterised, thus elucidating a possible role for this protein in HD pathogenesis. Martin et al. showed that HAP1 is localized in mitotic spindle of dividing striatal cells, and associated endosomes, microtubules and vesicles in the basal forebrain and striatal neurons – where HAP1B is preferentially expressed. Furthermore, Page and colleagues identified HAP1 mRNA in the following forebrain limbic nuclei: the amygdala, nucleus accumbens, dentate gyrus, septal nuclei, bed nucleus of the stria terminalis, and hypothalamus. They also identified HAP1 in numerous areas of the cortex, including the anterior cingulate cortex and the limbic cortex.

The subcellular location of HAP1 closely resembles that of Htt. Gutekunst and colleagues used immunogold labeling to identify subcellular localization of both HAP1 and muHtt, and identified a close similarity of the distribution of the two proteins. They did not find HAP1 labeling in protein aggregates in the cytoplasm and postulated that this indicated HAP1 in pre-aggregate related HD pathogenesis.

The role of HAP1 in HD pathogenesis may involve aberration of cell cycle processes, as high immunostaining of HAP1 during the cell cycle has been observed. It may have a part in spindle orientation, microtubule stabilization or chromosome movement. More importantly, HAP1 may also disrupt endocytosis, as it has been detected on vesicles involved in the early stages of this process. It is possible that the non-pathogenic activity of HAP1 is intracellular trafficking and that this is perturbed following its association with mHtt. HAP1 also interacts with proteins other than Htt and it is likely that their function is altered in HD pathogenesis. These include dynactin p150Glued, a cytoplasmic dynein accessory protein involved in retrograde transport of organelles, and kinesin-like protein which is another transport-mediation protein.

HAP1 also shows a similar CNS distribution pattern to that of neural nitric oxide synthase (nNos), especially in both of the pedunculopontine nuclei, the supraoptic nucleus, and the olfactory bulb. The possible significance of this interaction is that increased HAP1 interaction with muHtt may also increase nitric oxide (NO) thus facilitating neuronal damage.

HAP1 also interacts with other factors involved in vesicular trafficking including GABAA receptor, Rho-GEF, and HGS.
