= Salmonella virus PsP3 =

Virus classification
- (unranked): Virus
- Realm: Duplodnaviria
- Kingdom: Heunggongvirae
- Phylum: Uroviricota
- Class: Caudoviricetes
- Family: Peduoviridae
- Genus: Eganvirus
- Species: Salmonella virus PsP3

Species of virus

Salmonella virus PsP3 is a virus of the family Peduoviridae, genus Eganvirus.

As a member of the group I of the Baltimore classification, Salmonella virus PsP3 is a dsDNA virus. All peduoviruses share a nonenveloped morphology consisting of a head and a tail separated by a neck. Its genome is linear. The propagation of the virions includes the attaching to a host cell (a bacterium, as Salmonella virus PsP3 is a bacteriophage) and the injection of the double stranded DNA; the host transcribes and translates it to manufacture new particles. To replicate its genetic content requires host cell DNA polymerases and, hence, the process is highly dependent on the cell cycle.
