= Tigrvirus E202 =

Virus classification
- (unranked): Virus
- Realm: Duplodnaviria
- Kingdom: Heunggongvirae
- Phylum: Uroviricota
- Class: Caudoviricetes
- Family: Peduoviridae
- Genus: Tigrvirus
- Species: Tigrvirus E202

Synonyms
- Burkholderia phage phiE202; Burkholderia virus phiE202

Species of virus

Tigrvirus E202 is a bacteriophage (a virus that infects bacteria) of the family Peduovirinae, genus Tigrvirus.
