= Hpunavirus =

Virus classification
- (unranked): Virus
- Realm: Duplodnaviria
- Kingdom: Heunggongvirae
- Phylum: Uroviricota
- Class: Caudoviricetes
- Family: Peduoviridae
- Genus: Hpunavirus

Genus of viruses

Hpunavirus (synonyms Hp1likevirus and Hpunalikevirus) is a genus of viruses in the family Peduoviridae. Bacteria serve as the natural host, with transmission achieved through passive diffusion. There are two species in this genus.

== Taxonomy ==
The following two species are assigned to the genus:

- Hpunavirus HP1
- Hpunavirus HP2

== Structure ==
Hpunalikeviruses are nonenveloped, with a head and tail. The head is approximately 60 nm in diameter and an elongated icosahedral symmetry (T=7), composed of 60 hexamers and 12 pentamers (72 capsomers in total). The tail is around 135 nm long, 18 nm wide, has 6 long terminal fibers, 6 short spikes and a small base plate. The tail is enclosed in a sheath, which loosens and slides around the tail core upon contraction.

== Genome ==
Both species have been fully sequenced. They range between 30k and 34k nucleotides, with 37 to 45 proteins. All complete genomes are available from NCBI.

== Life cycle ==
The virus attaches to the host cell using its terminal fibers, and uses viral exolysin to degrade the cell wall enough to eject the viral DNA into the host cytoplasm via contraction of its tail sheath. Once the viral genes have been replicated, the procapsid is assembled and packed. The tail is then assembled and the mature virions are released via lysis.

== History ==
According to ICTV's 2010–11 report, the genus Hpunalikevirus was first accepted under the name Hp1likevirus. It was a new genus, accepted at the same time as all six of its contained species, as well as its containing subfamily Peduovirinae. The name was changed in the following report (2012). These proposals are available here and here, respectively. The name was later renamed to Hpunavirus.
