= RNF2 =

Protein-coding gene in humans

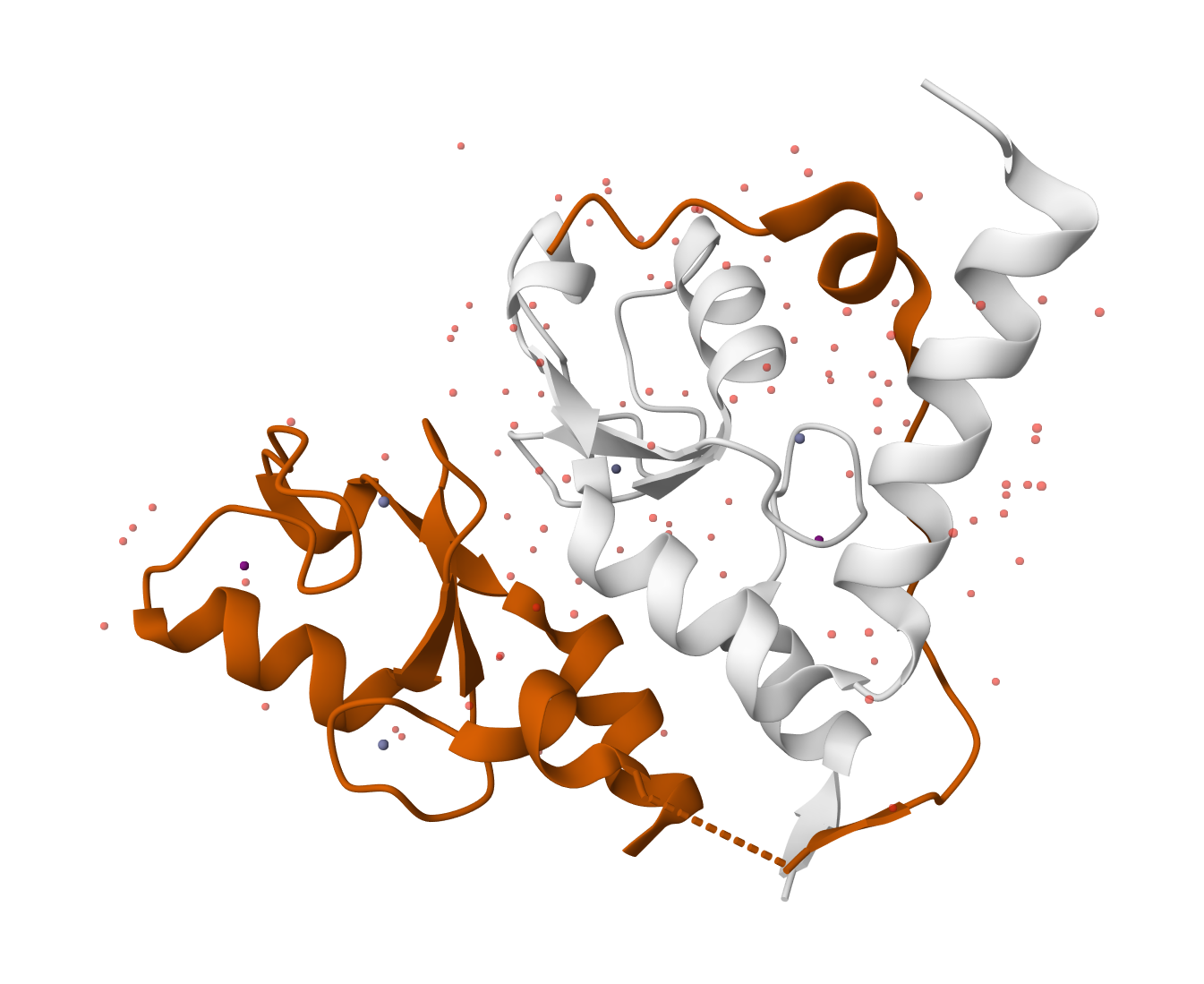

Identifiers
- Aliases: RNF2, BAP-1, BAP1, DING, HIPI3, RING1B, RING2, ring finger protein 2, ring1B, LUSYAM
- External IDs: OMIM: 608985; MGI: 1101759; GeneCards: RNF2
Available structures
PDB	Ortholog search: PDBe RCSB
PDB	List of PDB id codes 2H0D, 3GS2, 3H8H, 3IXS, 3RPG, 4R8P, 4S3O
Enzyme activity
EC #	BRENDA	ExPASy	KEGG	MetaCyc
2.3.2.27	↗	↗	↗	↗

Gene location (Human)
Chr.	Chromosome 1 (human)
Band	1q25.3	Start	185,045,526 bp
Band	1q25.3	End	185,102,603 bp

Gene location (Mouse)
Chr.	Chromosome 1 (mouse)
Band	1|1 G1	Start	151,333,755 bp
Band	1|1 G1	End	151,376,706 bp
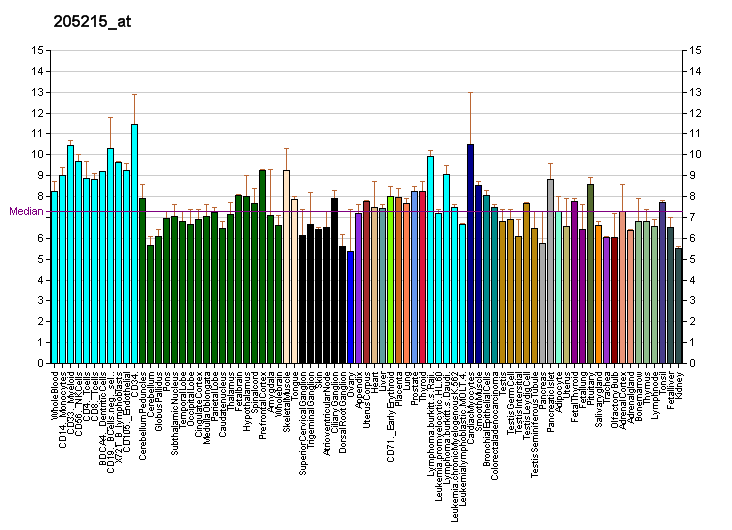
RNA expression pattern
Bgee	Human / Mouse (ortholog); Top expressed in: gonad; ganglionic eminence; ventricular zone; islet of Langerhans; stromal cell of endometrium; testicle; monocyte; Achilles tendon; epithelium of colon; buccal mucosa cell / Top expressed in: genital tubercle; zygote; tail of embryo; medial ganglionic eminence; secondary oocyte; Gonadal ridge; mandibular prominence; atrioventricular valve; maxillary prominence; primary oocyte; More reference expression data
BioGPS	More reference expression data
Gene ontology
Molecular function	ubiquitin protein ligase activity; chromatin binding; RING-like zinc finger domain binding; metal ion binding; ubiquitin-protein transferase activity; protein binding; transferase activity; zinc ion binding
Cellular component	euchromatin; sex chromatin; ubiquitin ligase complex; nucleoplasm; chromosome; heterochromatin; MLL1 complex; PRC1 complex; PcG protein complex; nucleus; nuclear body
Biological process	germ cell development; histone H2A-K119 monoubiquitination; regulation of transcription, DNA-templated; gastrulation with mouth forming second; histone H2A monoubiquitination; negative regulation of transcription by RNA polymerase II; negative regulation of DNA-binding transcription factor activity; transcription, DNA-templated; protein ubiquitination; mitotic cell cycle; anterior/posterior axis specification; histone ubiquitination; negative regulation of G0 to G1 transition
Sources:Amigo / QuickGO
Orthologs
Databases	NCBI: entry; OMA: entry
Species	Human	Mouse
Entrez	6045	19821
Ensembl	ENSG00000121481	ENSMUSG00000026484
UniProt	Q99496	Q9CQJ4
RefSeq (mRNA)	NM_007212	NM_011277; NM_001360844; NM_001360845; NM_001360847
RefSeq (protein)	NP_009143	NP_035407; NP_001347773; NP_001347774; NP_001347776
Location (UCSC)	Chr 1: 185.05 – 185.1 Mb	Chr 1: 151.33 – 151.38 Mb
PubMed search
- Wikidata
View/Edit Human	View/Edit Mouse

E3 ubiquitin-protein ligase RING2 is an enzyme that in humans is encoded by the RNF2 gene.

Polycomb group (PcG) of proteins form the multiprotein complexes that are important for the transcription repression of various genes involved in development and cell proliferation. The protein encoded by this gene is one of the PcG proteins. It has been shown to interact with, and suppress the activity of, transcription factor CP2 (TFCP2/CP2). Studies of the mouse counterpart suggested the involvement of this gene in the specification of anterior-posterior axis, as well as in cell proliferation in early development. This protein was also found to interact with an ubiquitin-conjugating enzyme UBE2K, and possess ubiquitin ligase activity.

== Interactions ==
RNF2 has been shown to interact with TFCP2 and UBE2K.

== See also ==
- RING finger domain
