= HPI =

HPI may refer to:

== Organisations ==
- HPI Ltd, a British company that provides vehicle history checks and car valuations
- HPI Groupe, a French company specialized in radio broadcasting
- HPI, LLC, an American company specialized in industrial turbo-machinery
- Huaneng Power International, a Chinese power company
- Huron Potawatomi, Inc., the business division of the Nottawaseppi Huron Band of Potawatomi
- Heinrich Pette Institute, an institute for basic research in virology and immunology, based in Hamburg, Germany
- Hasso Plattner Institute for Digital Engineering, an information technology university college in Potsdam, Germany
- HP Inc., an American technology company

== Medicine ==
- Human probiotic infusion, a treatment, targeting the intestines
- High probability instruction, a behaviorist therapy based on positive reinforcement
- History of the present illness, a detailed interview prompted by the chief complaint or presenting symptom

== Economics ==
- House price index, a measure of property value
- Human Poverty Index, a United Nations measure of the amount of poverty in various countries

== Other uses ==
- Human performance improvement, a field of study related to process improvement methodologies
- Happy Planet Index, an index of human well-being and environmental impact
- Hardware Platform Interface, a technical specification defined by the Service Availability Forum
- Henley Passport Index, a measure of how easy travel is for citizens of a country
- HPI (TV series), a 2021 French television series.

hpi may refer to:

- hours post infection
