= Health Insurance Plan of New Jersey =

Former health insurance plan by the state of New Jersey

Health Insurance Plan of New Jersey or HIP of New Jersey was a Health Maintenance Organization in New Jersey that was declared insolvent in 1998 and filed for bankruptcy in 1999. The bankruptcy left some people with no insurance coverage. Jaynee LaVecchia, the State Commissioner of Banking and Insurance, proposed legislation to create a fund to pay the costs of future HMO failures in New Jersey. The company offered a range of health insurance plans for individuals, families, and small businesses, including HMO, PPO, and EPO plans. HIPNJ also offers a range of additional services, such as wellness programs and resources for managing chronic conditions.

== History ==
In 1997, the health maintenance organization entered into an asset purchase agreement with PHP Healthcare Corporation of Reston, Virginia (PHP), a Delaware for-profit corporation. In 1999, the company went bankrupt when the $120 million they were owed by Pinnacle Health Enterprises was never paid.
