= Hipster =

Hipster(s) may refer to:

== Subcultures ==
- Hipster (1940s subculture), referring to aficionados of jazz, in particular bebop, which became popular in the early 1940s
- Hipster (contemporary subculture), a 21st century subculture, mainly among affluent youth with a liberal philosophy

== Film and television ==
- "Hipster" (Space Ghost Coast to Coast), a television episode
- Hipsters (TV series), Australian TV documentary series
- Stilyagi (film), a 2008 Russian film known as Hipsters in the English release

== Other uses ==
- Hipster, a development branch of the OpenIndiana operating system
- Hipster PDA, a paper-based personal organizer
- Low-rise (fashion), a style of clothing designed to sit low on, or below, the hips

== See also ==
- Bondi Hipsters, Australian mockumentary series on YouTube
