= Hockey Premier League =

- Sport: Ice Hockey
- Founded: March 21, 2016
- First season: 2016
- No. of teams: 18-22
- Country: Estonia (1 team); Latvia (1 team); Kazakhstan (1 team); Russia (9 teams)
- Related competitions: Kontinental Hockey League

The Hockey Premier League (HPL) (Russian: Хоккейная премьер-лига) is a proposed international professional ice hockey league that is due to launch in time for the 2016–17 season. The teams within the HPL will act as affiliate teams to those in the KHL, in much the same way that teams in the AHL are farm teams to those in the NHL.

Some KHL teams have already agreed to operate a farm team within the HPL in this league, Dinamo Riga amongst them, therefore those teams' affiliates should leave the VHL to join this new league. As the KHL playoffs are still underway, there have been no other official statements regarding this league, however, it is rumored that the new league will contain between 18 and 22 teams.

As of May 18, it seems that the proposed league will not take place after all. Dmitry Kurbatov Executive Director of the Ice Hockey Federation of Russia stated that the league will not be held, and that the VHL be consist of between 24 and 26 teams for the upcoming season.

== Teams ==
On April 7, it was announced that the KHL has received letters of intent from twelve teams who expressed their desire to join the HPL. Nine of these teams also announced which KHL team they would be affiliated with. In addition those listed below, the newly created Hockey Club Tallinn, as well as Kazzinc-Torpedo & Saryarka Karagandy, also pledged their intent to join the league, however, they did not mention which KHL team they would affiliated with.

| KHL Team | HPL Affiliate |
|---|---|
| AK Bars | Bars Kazan; Neftyanik Almetyevsk |
| CSKA Moscow | Zvezda Moscow |
| Dinamo Riga | Daugava Riga |
| Dynamo Moscow | Dynamo Balashikha |
| Salavat Yulaev | Toros Neftekamsk |
| SKA St Petersburg | SKA-Neva |
| Spartak Moscow | 2nd senior team |
| Traktor Chelyabinsk | Chelmet Chelyabinsk |
