= Hypertension in Pregnancy (journal) =

- Discipline: Gynecology
- Language: English

Publication details
- History: 1982-present
- Publisher: Informa
- Frequency: Quarterly
- Impact factor: 1.192 (2013)

Standard abbreviations
- ISO 4: Hypertens. Pregnancy

Indexing
- CODEN: HYPPEV
- ISSN: 1064-1955 (print); 1525-6065 (web)
- OCLC no.: 26226712

Links
- Journal homepage; Online access; Online archive

Hypertension in Pregnancy is a quarterly peer-reviewed medical journal covering human and animal hypertension during gestation, including the physiology of circulatory control, pathophysiology, methodology, and therapy. It is published by Informa and the editors-in-chief are Peter von Dadelszen (Canada) and Fiona Lyall (Scotland). According to the Journal Citation Reports, the journal has a 2013 impact factor of 1.192.
