= Peduovirus =

Virus classification
- (unranked): Virus
- Realm: Duplodnaviria
- Kingdom: Heunggongvirae
- Phylum: Uroviricota
- Class: Caudoviricetes
- Family: Peduoviridae
- Genus: Peduovirus

Genus of viruses

Peduovirus (also known as P2-like phages and P2-like viruses) is a genus of viruses in the family Peduoviridae of the class Caudoviricetes. Bacteria serve as natural hosts, with transmission achieved through passive diffusion. There are 30 recognised species in this genus.

== Taxonomy ==
The following species are recognized in the 2025 ICTV classification:

- Peduovirus 11W
- Peduovirus AC1
- Peduovirus DC1
- Peduovirus fiAA91ss
- Peduovirus FSLSP004
- Peduovirus GMG73
- Peduovirus GMS190
- Peduovirus HQ103
- Peduovirus L413C (formerly Yersinia virus L413C)
- Peduovirus magyaro
- Peduovirus P110331
- Peduovirus P2 (formerly Escherichia virus P2)
- Peduovirus P22H1
- Peduovirus P22H4
- Peduovirus P24A7b
- Peduovirus P24B2
- Peduovirus P24C9
- Peduovirus P24E6b
- Peduovirus P37
- Peduovirus pro147
- Peduovirus pro483
- Peduovirus pv12474III
- Peduovirus R18C
- Peduovirus SIAC10
- Peduovirus SIDE7
- Peduovirus STYP1
- Peduovirus Wphi (formerly Escherichia virus Wphi)
- Peduovirus YPM22
- Peduovirus YPM46
- Peduovirus YPM50

== Structure ==
Peduoviruses are nonenveloped, with a head and tail. The icosahedral head is approximately 60 nm in diameter and a dextral symmetry (T=7), composed of 72 capsomers. The tail is around 135 nm long, 18 nm wide, has 6 short, kinked tail fibers. The tail is enclosed in a sheath, which loosens and slides around the tail core upon contraction.

Genus	Structure	Symmetry	Capsid	Genomic arrangement	Genomic segmentation
Peduovirus	Head-Tail	T=7 dextro	Non-enveloped	Linear	Monopartite

== Genome ==
Nine of the viruses' genomes have been fully sequenced and are available on NCBI's website (though Salmonella phage Fels-2 is currently listed as unclassified). They range between 30k and 39k nucleotides, with 40 to 51 proteins. Complete genomes, as well as several additional "unclassified" virus genomes, are available at

== Life cycle ==
Viral replication is cytoplasmic. The virus attaches to the host cell using its tail fibers, and ejects the viral DNA into the host cytoplasm via contraction of its tail sheath. DNA-templated transcription is the method of transcription. Once the viral genes have been replicated, the procapsid is assembled and packed. The tail is then assembled and the mature virions are released via lysis and holin/endolysin/spanin proteins.

Genus	Host details	Tissue tropism	Entry details	Release details	Replication site	Assembly site	Transmission
Peduovirus	Bacteria	None	Injection	Lysis	Cytoplasm	Cytoplasm	Passive diffusion

== History ==
According to ICTV's 1996 report, the genus P2likevirus was first accepted under the name P2-like phages in the family Myoviridae, unassigned to a sub-family. The genus name was changed to P2-like viruses in the ICTV 7th Report in 1999. It was moved into the subfamily Peduovirinae upon its inception in 2010-11. The following year (2012), the genus was renamed to P2likevirus. These reports are available through ICTV here: 1996, 1999, 2010, 2012. The genus was later renamed to Peduovirus. In 2021, subfamily Peduovirinae was elevated to family Peduoviridae.
