= Admiral Hipper =

Admiral Hipper may refer to:

- Franz von Hipper (1863–1932), German Admiral who served in World War I
- German cruiser Admiral Hipper, a ship named after the admiral, launched in 1937 and served in World War II
