= F8A1 =

Protein-coding gene in humans

Identifiers
- Aliases: F8A1, DXS522E, F8A, HAP40, coagulation factor VIII-associated 1, coagulation factor VIII associated 1
- External IDs: OMIM: 305423; MGI: 95474; GeneCards: F8A1

Gene location (Human)
Chr.	X chromosome (human)
Band	Xq28	Start	154,886,355 bp
Band	Xq28	End	154,888,061 bp

Gene location (Mouse)
Chr.	X chromosome (mouse)
Band	X A7.3|X 37.29 cM	Start	72,271,897 bp
Band	X A7.3|X 37.29 cM	End	72,274,401 bp
RNA expression pattern
Bgee	Human / Mouse (ortholog); Top expressed in: blood; muscle tissue; testicle; brain; hippocampus proper; liver; putamen; caudate nucleus; dorsolateral prefrontal cortex / Top expressed in: primary oocyte; muscle of thigh; urethra; right kidney; ankle joint; secondary oocyte; neural tube; islet of Langerhans; dentate gyrus of hippocampal formation granule cell; pharynx; More reference expression data
BioGPS	n/a
Gene ontology
Molecular function	molecular function; protein binding
Cellular component	nucleus
Biological process	biological process
Sources:Amigo / QuickGO
Orthologs
Databases	NCBI: entry; OMA: entry
Species	Human	Mouse
Entrez	8263	14070
Ensembl	ENSG00000288722	ENSMUSG00000078317
UniProt	P23610	Q9JJQ6
RefSeq (mRNA)	NM_012151	NM_007978
RefSeq (protein)	NP_001007524; NP_001007525; NP_036283	NP_032004
Location (UCSC)	Chr X: 154.89 – 154.89 Mb	Chr X: 72.27 – 72.27 Mb
PubMed search
- Wikidata
View/Edit Human	View/Edit Mouse

40-kDa huntingtin-associated protein also known as (Coagulation factor VIII associated 1) is a protein that in humans is encoded by the F8A1, F8A2, and F8A3 genes.

F8A1 is contained entirely within intron 22 of the factor VIII gene; spans less than 2 kb, and is transcribed in the direction opposite of factor VIII. A portion of intron 22 (int22h), containing F8A1, is repeated twice extragenically closer to the Xq telomere (genes F8A2, F8A3). Although its function is unknown, the observation that this gene is conserved in the mouse implies it has some function. Unlike factor VIII, this gene is transcribed abundantly in a wide variety of cell types.
