= Huntingtin-interacting protein 1 =

Protein-coding gene in the species Homo sapiens

HIP1
Available structures
PDB	Ortholog search: PDBe RCSB
PDB	List of PDB id codes 2NO2, 2QA7, 3I00

Identifiers
- Aliases: HIP1, HIP-I, ILWEQ, SHON, SHONbeta, SHONgamma, huntingtin interacting protein 1
- External IDs: OMIM: 601767; MGI: 1099804; HomoloGene: 68463; GeneCards: HIP1; OMA:HIP1 - orthologs

Gene location (Human)
Chr.	Chromosome 7 (human)
Band	7q11.23	Start	75,533,298 bp
Band	7q11.23	End	75,738,962 bp

Gene location (Mouse)
Chr.	Chromosome 5 (mouse)
Band	5 G2|5 75.18 cM	Start	135,406,531 bp
Band	5 G2|5 75.18 cM	End	135,545,120 bp
RNA expression pattern
Bgee	Human / Mouse (ortholog); Top expressed in: corpus callosum; sural nerve; inferior ganglion of vagus nerve; renal medulla; Achilles tendon; subthalamic nucleus; left testis; lower lobe of lung; popliteal artery; tibial arteries / Top expressed in: saccule; otic vesicle; ascending aorta; trigeminal ganglion; aortic valve; external carotid artery; ventricular zone; tail of embryo; internal carotid artery; lens; More reference expression data
BioGPS	n/a
Gene ontology
Molecular function	clathrin binding; structural constituent of cytoskeleton; protein binding; phosphatidylinositol binding; actin binding; phospholipid binding; epidermal growth factor receptor binding; phosphatidylinositol-4,5-bisphosphate binding; clathrin light chain binding; phosphatidylinositol-3-phosphate binding; glutamate receptor binding; AP-2 adaptor complex binding; clathrin adaptor activity; protein homodimerization activity; phosphatidylinositol-3,4-bisphosphate binding; protein heterodimerization activity; actin filament binding; phosphatidylinositol-3,5-bisphosphate binding
Cellular component	cytoplasm; Golgi apparatus; membrane; intracellular membrane-bounded organelle; clathrin-coated vesicle membrane; cytoskeleton; cytoplasmic vesicle; endomembrane system; clathrin-coated vesicle; nucleus; cytosol; AP-2 adaptor complex; extrinsic component of cytoplasmic side of plasma membrane; extrinsic component of presynaptic membrane; extrinsic component of postsynaptic membrane; presynapse; postsynapse; postsynaptic membrane; glutamatergic synapse; actin cortical patch
Biological process	regulation of apoptotic process; cell differentiation; positive regulation of receptor-mediated endocytosis; regulation of transcription, DNA-templated; endocytosis; transcription, DNA-templated; clathrin-dependent endocytosis; clathrin coat assembly; apoptotic signaling pathway; activation of cysteine-type endopeptidase activity involved in apoptotic process; apoptotic process; cytoskeleton organization; regulation of endocytosis; positive regulation of epidermal growth factor receptor signaling pathway; protein stabilization; positive regulation of protein kinase B signaling; membrane organization; neurotransmitter receptor transport; positive regulation of platelet-derived growth factor receptor-beta signaling pathway; actin filament organization
Sources:Amigo / QuickGO
Orthologs
Species	Human	Mouse
Entrez	3092	215114
Ensembl	ENSG00000127946	ENSMUSG00000039959
UniProt	O00291	Q8VD75
RefSeq (mRNA)	NM_001243198; NM_005338; NM_001382444; NM_001382445	NM_146001; NM_001382848
RefSeq (protein)	NP_001230127; NP_005329; NP_001369373; NP_001369374	NP_666113; NP_001369777
Location (UCSC)	Chr 7: 75.53 – 75.74 Mb	Chr 5: 135.41 – 135.55 Mb
PubMed search
- Wikidata
View/Edit Human	View/Edit Mouse

Huntingtin-interacting protein 1 also known as HIP-1 is a protein that in humans is encoded by the HIP1 gene.

Hip-1 is a protein that interacts with the huntingtin protein. It is known to contain a domain homologous to the death effector domains (DED) found on proteins involved in apoptosis. It is believed that accumulation of high levels of the free form of this protein (free as in dissociated from the huntingtin and free to bind other key protein(s)) in the cell is one of the mechanisms by which neuron cell death is caused in Huntington's disease (via the caspase-3 route). The role of Hip-1 in caspase mediated cell death remains unclear.

== Discovery ==
Huntingtin interacting protein 1 (HIP1) was first identified by Wanker et al. in 1997.

== Function ==
HIP1 was found to bind to Htt in an N-terminal dependent manner, and co-localise with Htt in the CNS although the nature of this interaction with respect to muHtt was not identified. It has since been found that the CAG expansion seen with muHtt results in decreased binding affinity for HIP1, thus causing disruption of HIP1’s usual function, and also an increase in free HIP1. It is likely that this decreased affinity plays a role in mediating HD pathogenesis, due to loss of cytoskeletal integrity and induction of apoptosis. HIP1’s pro apoptotic effect may involve activation of caspase-8 and a novel HIP1 protein interactor HIPPI. HIP1’s non-pathological activity includes clathrin assembly via interaction with clathrin light chains. HIP1 is the human homologue of Sla2p, a membrane protein in the periphery. Sla2p is an actin-binding protein involved in endocytosis, thus indicating HIP1 in this role. Further details suggesting an important role for Hip-1 in endocytosis comes from binding studies looking at Hip-1 binding to actin. Actin binding by Hip-1 is altered depending on whether clathrin is also bound to Hip-1.

== Clinical significance ==
HIP1 has also been found to be overexpressed in some cancers including a subset of colorectal and prostate cancers. This is of specific interest because prostate cancer disease progression involves altered transcription/expression of the androgen receptor (AR). The AR is a nuclear hormone receptor transcription factor that contains polyglutamine repeats. In 2005 Mills and colleagues showed that HIP1 is able to regulate transcription of hormone receptors via the androgen response element (ARE) and also alters the rate of degradation of the AR. It is likely that HIP1 is also able to regulate, or at least interact with proteins that also possess the ARE.
