= UBE2K =

Protein-coding gene in the species Homo sapiens

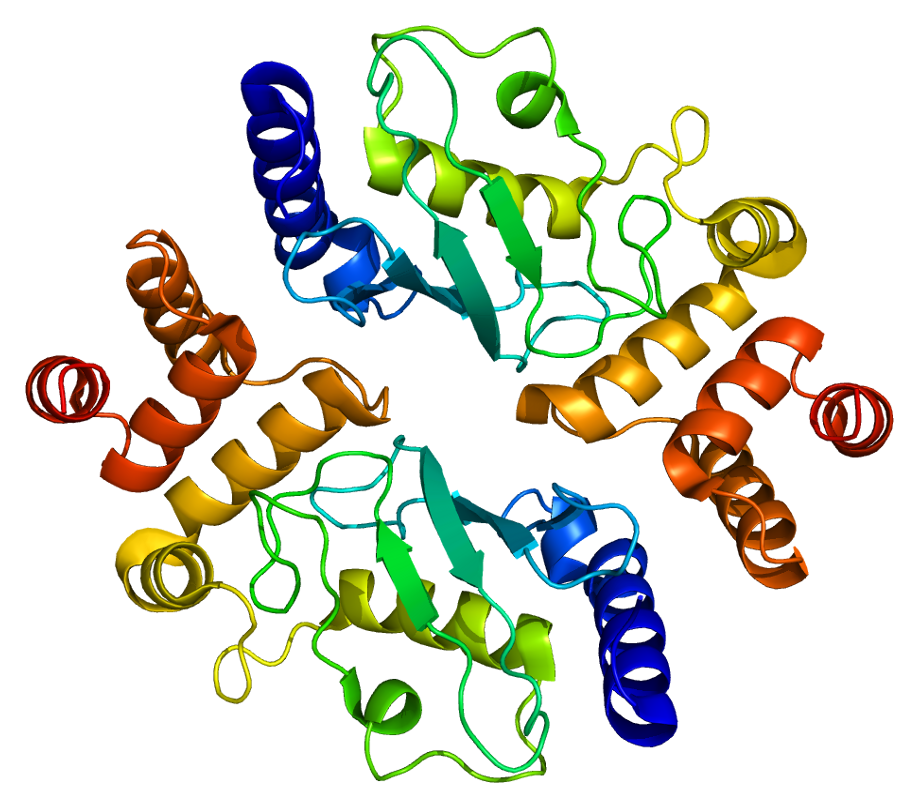

Identifiers
- Aliases: UBE2K, E2-25K, HIP2, HYPG, LIG, UBC1, ubiquitin conjugating enzyme E2 K
- External IDs: OMIM: 602846; MGI: 1858216; GeneCards: UBE2K
Available structures
PDB	Ortholog search: PDBe RCSB
PDB	List of PDB id codes 1YLA, 2O25, 3E46, 3F92, 3K9O, 3K9P, 5DFL
Enzyme activity
EC #	BRENDA	ExPASy	KEGG	MetaCyc
2.3.2.23	↗	↗	↗	↗

Gene location (Human)
Chr.	Chromosome 4 (human)
Band	4p14	Start	39,698,109 bp
Band	4p14	End	39,782,792 bp

Gene location (Mouse)
Chr.	Chromosome 5 (mouse)
Band	5 C3.1|5 33.72 cM	Start	65,694,576 bp
Band	5 C3.1|5 33.72 cM	End	65,756,331 bp
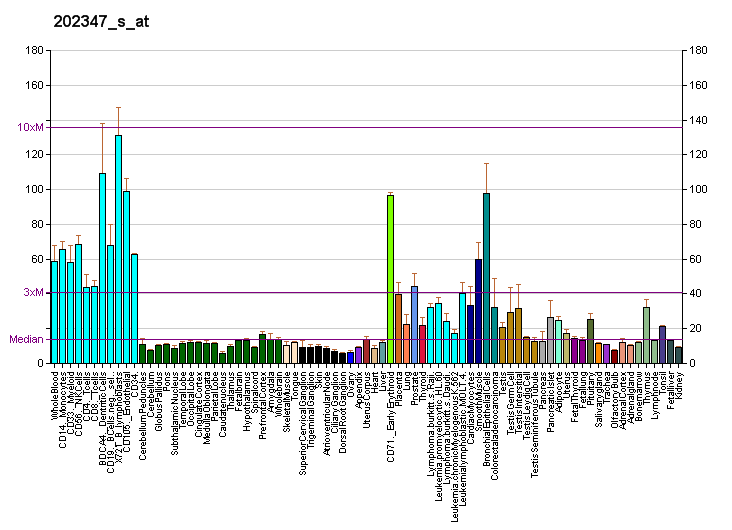

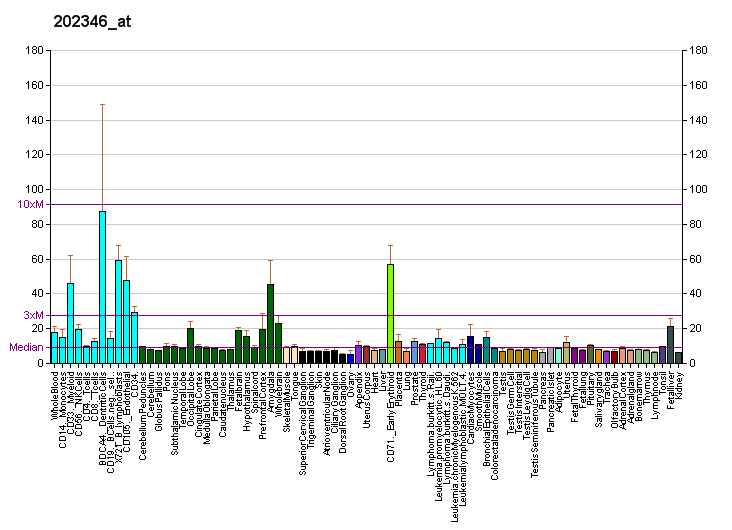
RNA expression pattern
Bgee	Human / Mouse (ortholog); Top expressed in: sperm; secondary oocyte; islet of Langerhans; postcentral gyrus; Brodmann area 23; middle temporal gyrus; amniotic fluid; buccal mucosa cell; superior frontal gyrus; stromal cell of endometrium / Top expressed in: seminiferous tubule; zygote; tail of embryo; primary oocyte; primitive streak; secondary oocyte; abdominal wall; genital tubercle; yolk sac; hair follicle; More reference expression data
BioGPS	More reference expression data
Gene ontology
Molecular function	ubiquitin-protein transferase activity; transferase activity; nucleotide binding; ubiquitin-ubiquitin ligase activity; protein binding; ATP binding; ubiquitin protein ligase binding; ubiquitin conjugating enzyme activity
Cellular component	cytoplasm; filopodium tip; nucleus; cytosol
Biological process	protein K48-linked ubiquitination; positive regulation of type I interferon-mediated signaling pathway; intrinsic apoptotic signaling pathway in response to endoplasmic reticulum stress; free ubiquitin chain polymerization; positive regulation of peptidyl-threonine phosphorylation; ubiquitin-dependent protein catabolic process; cellular response to interferon-beta; proteasome-mediated ubiquitin-dependent protein catabolic process; regulation of proteasomal ubiquitin-dependent protein catabolic process; protein ubiquitination
Sources:Amigo / QuickGO
Orthologs
Databases	NCBI: entry; OMA: entry
Species	Human	Mouse
Entrez	3093	53323
Ensembl	ENSG00000078140	ENSMUSG00000029203
UniProt	P61086	P61087
RefSeq (mRNA)	NM_005339; NM_001111112; NM_001111113; NM_001312646; NM_001312647 NM_001312648; NM_032733	NM_016786; NM_001310618; NM_001310619
RefSeq (protein)	NP_001104582; NP_001104583; NP_001299575; NP_001299576; NP_001299577 NP_005330	NP_001297547; NP_001297548; NP_058066
Location (UCSC)	Chr 4: 39.7 – 39.78 Mb	Chr 5: 65.69 – 65.76 Mb
PubMed search
- Wikidata
View/Edit Human	View/Edit Mouse

Ubiquitin-conjugating enzyme E2 K is a protein that in humans is encoded by the UBE2K gene.

The protein encoded by this gene belongs to the ubiquitin-conjugating enzyme family. It binds selectively to a large region at the N terminus of huntingtin. This interaction is not influenced by the length of the huntingtin polyglutamine tract. This protein has been implicated in the degradation of huntingtin and suppression of apoptosis.

== Interactions ==
UBE2K has been shown to interact with Huntingtin and RNF2.
