= HIP1R =

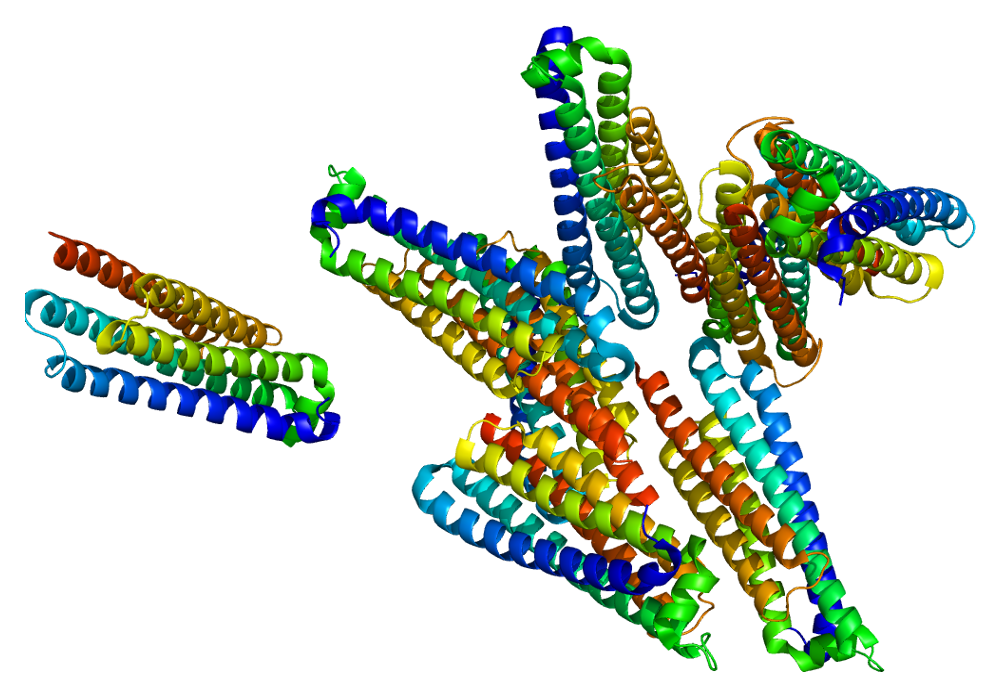
Available structures
PDB	Ortholog search: PDBe RCSB
PDB	List of PDB id codes 1R0D

Identifiers
- Aliases: HIP1R, HIP12, HIP3, ILWEQ, huntingtin interacting protein 1 related
- External IDs: OMIM: 605613; MGI: 1352504; HomoloGene: 78348; GeneCards: HIP1R; OMA:HIP1R - orthologs

Gene location (Human)
Chr.	Chromosome 12 (human)
Band	12q24.31	Start	122,834,453 bp
Band	12q24.31	End	122,862,961 bp

Gene location (Mouse)
Chr.	Chromosome 5 (mouse)
Band	5|5 F	Start	124,111,691 bp
Band	5|5 F	End	124,143,621 bp
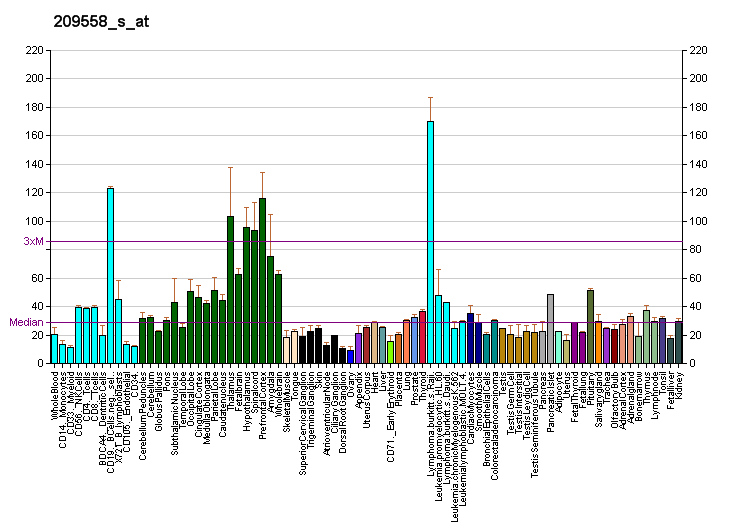

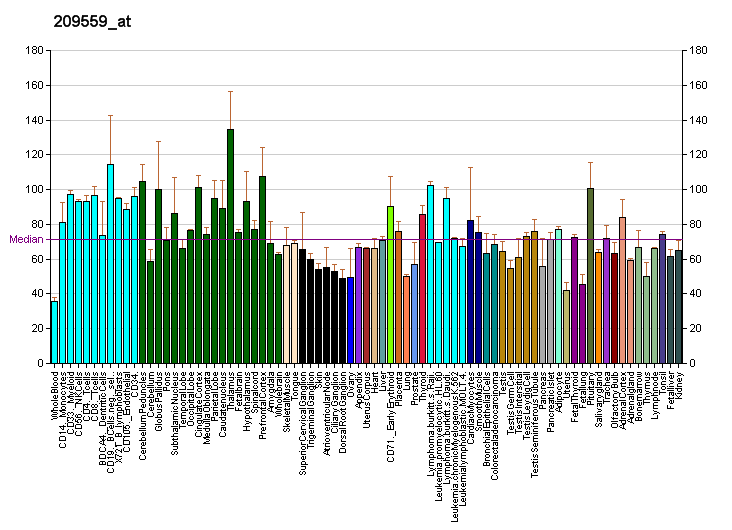

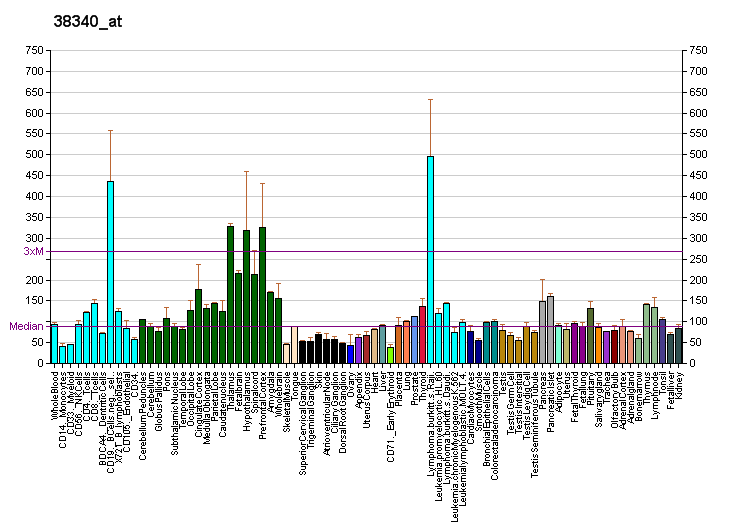
RNA expression pattern
Bgee	Human / Mouse (ortholog); Top expressed in: C1 segment; inferior olivary nucleus; skin of leg; right frontal lobe; body of pancreas; amygdala; skin of abdomen; anterior pituitary; dorsal motor nucleus of vagus nerve; hypothalamus / Top expressed in: transitional epithelium of urinary bladder; saccule; epithelium of stomach; granulocyte; otic placode; otic vesicle; hair follicle; lip; submandibular gland; motor neuron; More reference expression data
BioGPS	More reference expression data
Gene ontology
Molecular function	actin binding; protein binding; phospholipid binding; phosphatidylinositol binding; phosphatidylinositol-4,5-bisphosphate binding; phosphatidylinositol-3,4,5-trisphosphate binding; SH3 domain binding; clathrin binding; clathrin light chain binding; clathrin adaptor activity; protein homodimerization activity; phosphatidylinositol-3,4-bisphosphate binding; protein heterodimerization activity; actin filament binding; phosphatidylinositol-3,5-bisphosphate binding; identical protein binding
Cellular component	perinuclear region of cytoplasm; clathrin-coated pit; cytoskeleton; clathrin-coated vesicle membrane; intracellular membrane-bounded organelle; endomembrane system; membrane; cytoplasmic vesicle; clathrin-coated vesicle; cytoplasm; mitochondrion; cytosol; cell cortex; postsynaptic density; apical plasma membrane; ruffle membrane; dendrite cytoplasm; soma; dendritic spine; synaptic membrane; AP-2 adaptor complex; actin cortical patch
Biological process	endocytosis; receptor-mediated endocytosis; apoptotic process; activation of cysteine-type endopeptidase activity involved in apoptotic process; regulation of endocytosis; negative regulation of actin filament polymerization; positive regulation of protein binding; regulation of actin cytoskeleton organization; negative regulation of Arp2/3 complex-mediated actin nucleation; positive regulation of apoptotic process; negative regulation of apoptotic process; positive regulation of epidermal growth factor receptor signaling pathway; clathrin coat assembly; protein stabilization; digestive system development; regulation of gastric acid secretion; membrane organization; positive regulation of mitochondrial outer membrane permeabilization involved in apoptotic signaling pathway; positive regulation of clathrin coat assembly; positive regulation of platelet-derived growth factor receptor-beta signaling pathway; regulation of clathrin-dependent endocytosis; actin filament organization; positive regulation of receptor-mediated endocytosis
Sources:Amigo / QuickGO
Orthologs
Species	Human	Mouse
Entrez	9026	29816
Ensembl	ENSG00000130787	ENSMUSG00000000915
UniProt	O75146	Q9JKY5
RefSeq (mRNA)	NM_001303097; NM_001303099; NM_003959	NM_145070
RefSeq (protein)	NP_001290026; NP_001290028; NP_003950	NP_659507
Location (UCSC)	Chr 12: 122.83 – 122.86 Mb	Chr 5: 124.11 – 124.14 Mb
PubMed search
- Wikidata
View/Edit Human	View/Edit Mouse

Huntingtin-interacting protein 1-related protein is a protein that in humans is encoded by the HIP1R gene.
