= Peduoviridae =

Virus classification
- (unranked): Virus
- Realm: Duplodnaviria
- Kingdom: Heunggongvirae
- Phylum: Uroviricota
- Class: Caudoviricetes
- Family: Peduoviridae

Genera
- See text

Family of viruses

Peduoviridae is a family of viruses in the class Caudoviricetes. It was previously treated as a subfamily of the morphology based family Myoviridae, which has been found to be paraphyletic and is no longer recognised. Bacteria serve as natural hosts. The family contains 59 genera.

== Taxonomy ==
The following genera are recognized:

- Acarajevirus
- Aptresvirus
- Aresaunavirus
- Arsenicumvirus
- Arsyunavirus
- Baylorvirus
- Bielevirus
- Bracchivirus
- Canoevirus
- Catalunyavirus
- Citexvirus
- Dagavirus
- Duodecimduovirus
- Duonihilunusvirus
- Eganvirus
- Elveevirus
- Entnonagintavirus
- Evevirus
- Felsduovirus
- Finvirus
- Firavirus
- Gegavirus
- Gegevirus
- Gemsvirus
- Graikaemvirus
- Hpunavirus
- Inibicvirus
- Irrigatiovirus
- Irtavirus
- Kapieceevirus
- Kayeltresvirus
- Kisquattuordecimvirus
- Kisquinquevirus
- Longwoodvirus
- Maltschvirus
- Mersinvirus
- Nampongvirus
- Novemvirus
- Peduovirus
- Phitrevirus
- Piscesmortuivirus
- Playavirus
- Plazymidvirus
- Quadragintavirus
- Reginaelenavirus
- Reipivirus
- Sanguivirus
- Senquatrovirus
- Seongnamvirus
- Simpcentumvirus
- Tigrvirus
- Tresduoquattuorvirus
- Valbvirus
- Vimunumvirus
- Vulnificusvirus
- Wadgaonvirus
- Xuanwuvirus
- Yongunavirus
- Yulgyerivirus

== Structure ==
Viruses in Peduoviridae are non-enveloped, with icosahedral and Head-tail geometries, and T=7 symmetry. The diameter is around 60 nm. Genomes are linear, around 33kb in length. The genome codes for 45 proteins.

== Life cycle ==
Viral replication is cytoplasmic. Entry into the host cell is achieved by adsorption into the host cell. DNA-templated transcription is the method of transcription. The virus exits the host cell by lysis, and holin/endolysin/spanin proteins. Bacteria serve as the natural host. Transmission routes are passive diffusion.

== See also ==
- Mannheimia virus PHL101
- Salmonella virus PsP3
- Tigrvirus E202
