= Autoinflammatory disease =

Group of innate immune system disorders

Autoinflammatory diseases (AIDs) are a group of rare disorders caused by dysfunction of the innate immune system. These responses are characterized by periodic or chronic systemic inflammation, usually without the involvement of adaptive immunity.

Autoinflammatory diseases are a separate class from autoimmune diseases; however, both are characterized by an immune system malfunction that may cause similar symptoms, such as rash, swelling or fatigue. However, the main source of the diseases are different. A key difference between the two classes of diseases is that while autoinflammatory disease triggers a malfunction of the innate immune system, autoimmune diseases trigger a malfunction of the adaptive immune system.

The distinction between autoinflammatory (overactivity of the innate immunity), autoimmune (overactivity of the adaptive immunity) and immunodeficient (decreased activity of the innate or adaptive immunity) is not concretely defined. Clinical phenotypes associated with autoinflammatory conditions are due to the type of cell vulnerable to cellular processes, often due to a specific mutation or cellular signal which may present as excessive activation of neutrophils, monocytes/macrophages and dendritic cells causing auto-inflammatory symptoms, or T cell and B cell dysfunction leading to autoimmunity. Failure of innate and/or adaptive immune cells to appropriately activate, recognize, and clear infectious agents causes immunodeficiency and vulnerability to infection.

== Classification ==
=== Clinical classification ===
1. Episodic and multisystem AIDs (NLRP12-associated disease, mevalonate kinase deficiency, PFAPA (periodic fever syndrome, aphthous stomatitis, pharyngitis, and cervical adenitis) or TRAPS (tumor necrosis factor (TNF) receptor–associated periodic fever syndrome))
2. Episodic, affecting the joints (gout)
3. Episodic, affecting bone (chronic recurrent multifocal osteomyelitis (CRMO))
4. Persistent and multisystemic (Schnitzler syndrome, Crohn's disease, or DIRA)
5. Persistent, affecting the skin (Interleukin-36-receptor antagonist deficiency (DITRA), Sweet syndrome or neutrophilic panniculitis)

=== Molecular mechanism of origin ===
1. Inflammasome activation (Mevalonate kinase deficiency or Muckle–Wells syndrome)
2. NFκB activation (NLRP12-associated disease, Crohn's disease or Blau syndrome)
3. IL‑1β pathway dysregulation (PFAPA, Schnitzler syndrome, DIRA or DITRA)
4. Impaired efficacy of cytotoxic T lymphocytes with compensatory macrophage activation (Familial hemophagocytic lymphohistiocytosis (HLH))
5. Inactivation of IL‑10 signaling (Early-onset enterocolitis)
6. Multiple (TRAPS) and Uncharacterized (CRMO or Behçet disease)

=== Simplified classification by the predominant cytokine or pathway ===
1. IL-1 mediated
2. IFN-mediated
3. Mediated by increased NF-κB activation

== Mechanisms of origin ==
Most proteins known to be involved in hereditary AIDs are involved in the regulation of interleukin-1 β (IL-1β). Their mutations induce increased and/or prolonged secretion of IL-1β, an inflammatory and fever-inducing cytokine.

Patients with AIDs often suffer from non-infectious fever and organ inflammation that may occur across one or multiple organ-systems. The excessive secretion of inflammatory cytokines and chemokines leads to organ damage and can be life-threatening. For such patients, excessive interleukin-1 signaling, constitutive NF-κB activation, and chronic IFN I signaling are specific. Some autoinflammatory disorders have not been demonstrated to have any specific inflammatory mediators such as cytokines, chemokines or eicosanoids and are, instead, believed to be caused by the accumulation of metabolites or triggered by stress within the cell or cellular death

=== Loss of negative regulators ===
Loss of negative regulators results in an inability to attenuate pro-inflammatory cytokine responses, causing autoinflammation.

Among these negative regulators, antagonists of IL-1 receptor (IL-1Ra) or IL-36 receptor (IL-36Ra) can be concluded. Loss-of-function mutations of IL-1Ra can develop fatal systemic inflammatory response syndrome. Another example is the inability of the anti-inflammatory cytokines, such as IL-10, to signal through its receptor. That, again, can lead to systemic inflammation and severe inflammatory bowel disease (IBD). This shows that even single-cytokine dysregulation can cause autoinflammatory diseases. Some mutations can change the ability of cytotoxic cells to induce cell death, failing to terminate macrophage and dendritic cell activation and causing macrophage activation syndrome.

=== Inflammasome-mediated autoinflammatory disorders ===
As indicated above, AIDs are caused by abnormal innate immune activation and, in the case of inflammasome disorders, are attributable to activation of an inflammasome complex nucleated by innate immune sensors such as NLRP1 (nucleotide-binding oligomerization domain (NOD)-like receptors), pyrin, or NLRC4 (NOD-like receptors (NLR) Family CARD Domain Containing 4).

Inflammasomes are cytoplasmic protein complexes that can generate active, secreted IL-1β and IL-18 from a cell. The sensors of innate immunity help to activate caspase 1 from pro-caspase 1. When activated, caspase 1 cleaves precursors of the pro-inflammatory cytokines pro-IL-1β and pro-IL-18 to their active forms.

==== NLRP1 ====
There have been reports of patients with activating mutations in NLRP1, where arginine is affected. There is a de novo heterozygous Pro1214Arg substitution in some cases, while in others there is a homozygous arginine to tryptophan substitution at position 726 (R726W). It has been shown that the mutation position matters. Pro1214Arg is located in the FIIND (from function to find domain) domain, which is important for NLRP1 activation. R726W is located in the linker region between the NOD and LRR (from leucine rich) domains.

All of the patients with such mutations exhibited dyskeratosis, arthritis, recurrent fever episodes, recurrent elevated CRP (from C-reactive protein) levels, and vitamin A deficiency.

Among the AIDs caused by the NLRP1 mutation are multiple self-healing palmoplantar carcinoma (MSPC) and familial keratosis lichenoides chronica (FKLC).

==== Pyrin ====
A hereditary disorder driven by pyrin mutation, called PAAND (Pyrin-associated autoinflammation with neutrophilic dermatosis), is characterized by neutrophilic dermatosis, recurrent fever, increased acute-phase reactants, arthralgia, or myalgia.

Patients with PAAND have a serine-to-arginine substitution at position 242 in pyrin. This loss of serine at position 242 causes the inability of 14-3-3 to bind to this region and to inhibit pyrin, resulting in spontaneous inflammasome formation by pyrin, increased recruitment of pro-caspase-1 via ASC (from adaptor molecule apoptosis-associated speck-like protein containing a CARD), increased IL-1β secretion, and pyroptosis.

The 14-3-3 molecule can bind and inhibit pyrin inflammasome activity due to RhoA activity. RhoA regulates pyrin through the activation of serine-threonine kinases, which phosphorylate the serine of pyrin at S208 and S242 and allow the signaling molecule 14-3-3 to bind pyrin. Already mentioned serine-to-arginine substitution at position 242 in pyrin causes the loss of RhoA activity and thus activation of the pyrin inflammasome.

One of the best-known pyrin AIDs is Mevalonate kinase deficiency, which is an enzyme in the cholesterol biosynthesis pathway. This loss/lack of enzyme results in mevalonic aciduria (MVA) and hyperimmunoglobulinemia D syndrome (HIDS).

=== Relopathies (NFkBopathies) ===
It has been proven that NF-κB (nuclear factor κB) is overactivated in cells of the gut mucosa of patients with inflammatory bowel diseases, including Crohn's disease (CD), which is a well known AID. The constitutive activation of NF-κB, not only in CD, is in particular caused by alanine (A20) deficiency.

NFκB pathway is tightly regulated through multiple posttranslational mechanisms including ubiquitination. Mutations in these regulatory pathways often cause diseases connected with malfunctions of NF-κB. The loss-of-function mutations in HOIL-1L and HOIP, which are subunits of the linear ubiquitin chain assembly complex (LUBAC), result in phenotypes, characterized by immunodeficiency, multi-organ autoinflammation, and elevated NF-κB signaling. Also the hypomorphic mutations in deubiquitinase enzyme OTULIN (from OTU deubiquitinase with linear linkage specificity), results in elevated NF-κB signaling causing an autoinflammatory syndrome. Similarly, patients with high-penetrance heterozygous mutations in the gene encoding A20 display excessive ubiquitination and increased activity of NFκB. Such patients present with Behçet-like characteristics or an autoimmune lymphoproliferative syndrome (ALPS)-like phenotype.

=== Interferonpathies ===
In addition to antivirus and antitumor effects, interferons (IFNs) also have broad immune-modulating functions, including enhancing the antigen-presentation function of dendritic cells, promoting T lymphocyte response and B lymphocyte antibody production, and restraining proinflammatory cytokine production. The production and signaling of IFNs are tightly regulated and dysregulation has been linked to inflammatory diseases, such as systemic lupus erythematosus and a growing number of conditions that clinically present as autoinflammatory diseases. It is very often a mutation that somehow influences the expression/function of IFNs. In the case of Aicardi-Goutieres syndrome 7 (AGS7), the gain-of-function mutation in a sensor molecule in the RNA-sensing pathway leads to both spontaneous and enhanced ligand-induced IFN-β transcription.

=== Dysregulation of proteasomes ===
Some AIDs, such as chronic atypical neutrophilic dermatosis with lipodystrophy and elevated temperature (CANDLE), appear to be associated with dysfunction of the proteasome. This syndrome is caused by a mutation in the gene that encodes subunit β type-8 of the proteasome (PSMB8 gene). Due to this mutation, there is a problem with the proteolysis of proteins and their presentation to the cells of innate immunity. This results in the accumulation of intermediates in the cell and accumulation of the proteins in the tissues. This leads to elevated cell stress, activation of Janus kinase, and production of IFNs.

=== Persistent macrophage activation ===
Systemic activation of macrophages is characterized by the accumulation of activated macrophages, which secrete a large number of inflammatory mediators, such as cytokines, chemokines, DAMPs, etc. They can become hemophagocytes. Once considered the diagnostic hallmarks of macrophage activation syndrome (MAS) and hemophagocytic lymphohistiocytosis (HLH), they can be abundant in organs of the reticuloendothelial system during systemic inflammation. These inflammatory cytokines cannot be cleared and inflammatory mediators cause fever, cytopenias, coagulopathy, and central nervous system inflammation, which can progress to sepsis-like pathophysiology, shock, and death. The progression of macrophage activation in the context of rheumatic diseases is historically called MAS, and in the context of the familial monogenic defects resulting in impaired NK (natural killer cells) or CD8+ T cell cytotoxicity, it is called HLH. Systemic macrophage activation is also associated with chronic overproduction of IL-18, which may also impair cytotoxicity. Chronic IL-18 exposure may cause impairments in cytotoxicity or NK cell death, thus promoting macrophage activation by priming lymphocyte inflammatory response or disabling/depleting NK cells. IL-18-induced NK cell dysfunction resulting is a defect shared between MAS and cytotoxicity-related HLH. This macrophage activation can be caused by increased activity of intracellular sensor NLRC4 and subsequent constitutive NLRC4 inflammasome activation. The macrophage activation can be due to the loss of the negative regulatory effect of cytotoxicity.

== See also ==
- Periodic fever syndrome
