= Hemophagocytic lymphohistiocytosis =

Immune disorder in the blood leading to hyperinflammation

- Other names: HLH
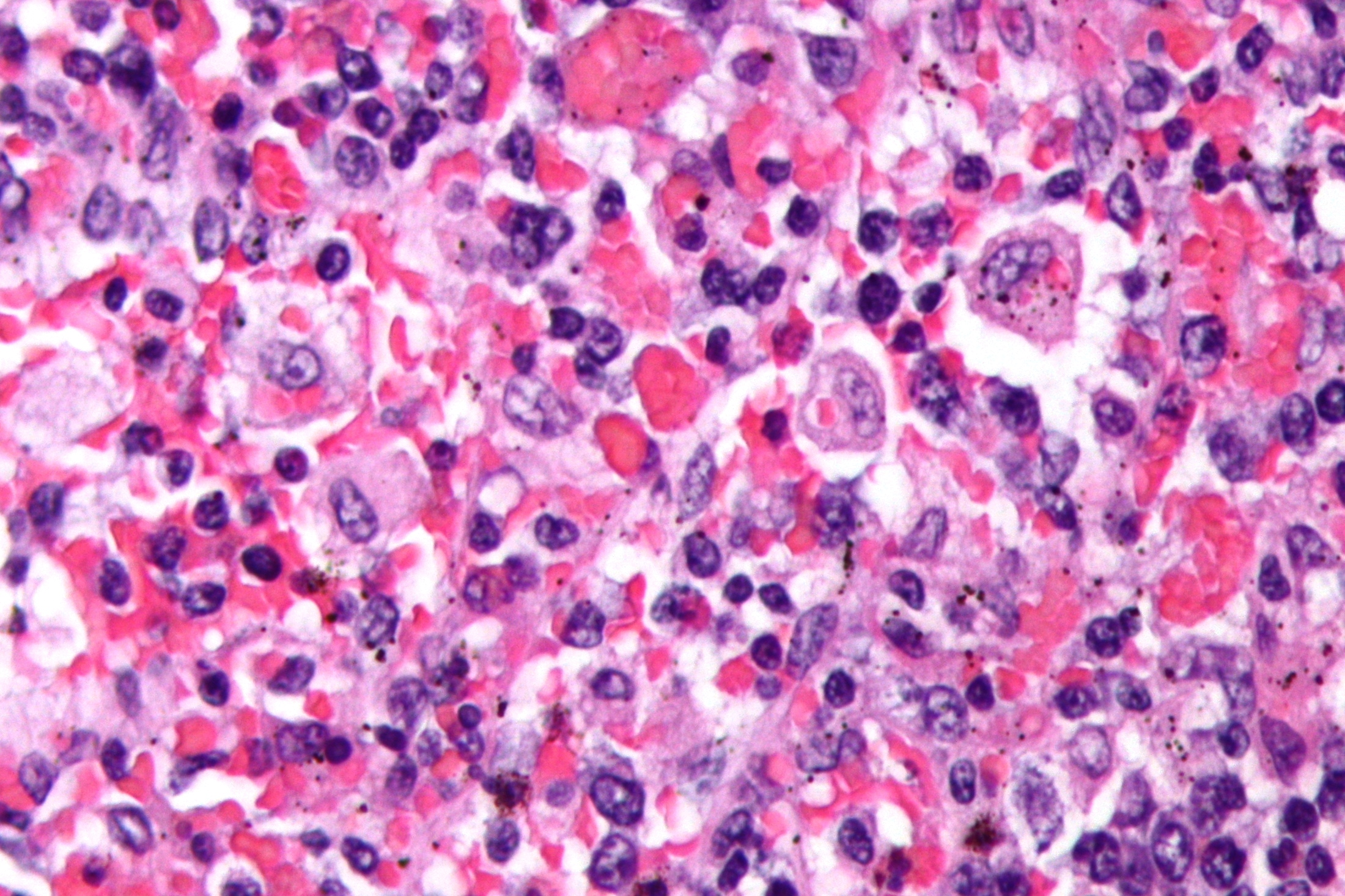
- Micrograph showing red blood cells within macrophages. H&E stain.
- Specialty: Hematology, immunology

In hematology, hemophagocytic lymphohistiocytosis (HLH), also known as haemophagocytic lymphohistiocytosis (British spelling), and hemophagocytic or haemophagocytic syndrome, is an uncommon hematologic disorder that presents more often in children than in adults. It is a life-threatening disease of severe hyperinflammation caused by uncontrolled proliferation of benign lymphocytes and macrophages that secrete high amounts of inflammatory cytokines. It is classified as one of the cytokine storm syndromes.

There are inherited (primary HLH) and acquired (secondary HLH) forms. The inherited form is due to genetic mutations and usually presents in infants and children, with a median age of onset of 3–6 months. Familial HLH is an autosomal recessive disease, hence each sibling of a child with familial HLH has a 25% chance of developing the disease, a 50% chance of carrying the defective gene (which is very rarely associated with any risk of disease), and a 25% chance of not being affected and not carrying the gene defect. Genes that are commonly mutated in those with primary HLH lead to defective lymphocyte (natural killer cell and cytotoxic T-cell) function. The mutated genes are PRF1 (perforin-1), UNC13D, STX11, and STXBP2. Secondary HLH usually presents in adulthood (usually in people with genetic changes predisposing them to the disease) after exposure to a trigger. Common triggers leading to secondary HLH include infections, cancer, or autoimmune diseases. The incidence of all forms of HLH was estimated to be 4.2 cases per 1 million people in a population-based study from England in 2018, but the true incidence is not known. The incidence of HLH (especially secondary HLH) is thought to be underestimated as the clinical signs and symptoms are very similar to sepsis.

== Signs and symptoms ==
HLH presents as a severe illness with sepsis-like symptoms. HLH clinically manifests with fever, enlargement of the liver and spleen, enlarged lymph nodes, yellow discoloration of the skin and eyes, and a rash. Laboratory findings may include cytopenia (low platelets, anemia, and less commonly neutropenia (low levels of neutrophils in the blood, a type of white blood cell)), extremely high levels of ferritin, elevated triglyceride levels, low fibrinogen levels, elevated levels of liver enzymes in the blood, and elevated blood levels of lactate dehydrogenase, among others. The findings of elevated ferritin, transaminases (ALT and AST), and hepatosplenomegaly (enlarged liver and spleen) are almost universally seen. Ferritin levels and soluble IL-2 receptor alpha can be tracked as markers of disease activity and response to treatment. Low fibrinogen levels and disseminated intravascular coagulation (DIC) in HLH can present as diffuse bleeding. Skin changes include bruising (petechia and purpura) and a maculopapular rash. Neurologic symptoms include seizures and incoordination (ataxia) in older children.

The onset of HLH occurs before the age of one year in approximately 70% of cases. Familial HLH should be suspected if siblings are diagnosed with HLH or if symptoms recur when therapy has been stopped.

The symptoms of primary (familial HLH) are similar to those of secondary HLH with no distinguishing features between the two forms.

HLH often present as sepsis that is unresponsive to standard treatments.

== Causes ==
Primary HLH is caused by high-penetrance variants in genes associated with the syndrome and thus is part of the phenotype of several inborn errors of immunity (IEI). The most common and best-studied causes of Primary HLH are loss of function, (i.e. inactivating) mutations in genes that code for proteins cytotoxic T cells and NK cells use to kill targeted cells, such as those infected with pathogens like the Epstein-Barr virus (EBV) or the Dengue virus. These mutations include those in the following genes: UNC13D, STX11, RAB27A, STXBP2, LYST, PRF1 1, SH2D1A, BIRC4, ITK, CD27, and MAGT1.

Secondary HLH is usually caused by infections (50% of cases), cancer (28%), or autoimmune diseases (12%). Of the infectious causes, 50% are caused by Epstein-Barr virus (EBV), 20% are caused by bacteria, and 7% are caused by cytomegalovirus (CMV). Of the causes due to cancer, 76% are due to lymphomas. And of the autoimmune causes, 39% are due to systemic lupus erythematosus (SLE). Other malignant disorders associated with secondary HLH include T-cell lymphoma, B-cell lymphoma, acute lymphocytic leukemia, acute myeloid leukemia, and myelodysplastic syndrome.

In rheumatic diseases, this syndrome is more often referred to as macrophage activation syndrome (MAS) and occurs most frequently in the juvenile onset and adult onset forms of Still's disease and systemic lupus erythematosus. It occurs rarely in juvenile idiopathic arthritis, juvenile Kawasaki disease, and rheumatoid arthritis.

Secondary HLH also occurs rarely in immunodeficiency disorders such as severe combined immunodeficiency, DiGeorge syndrome, Wiskott–Aldrich syndrome, ataxia–telangiectasia, and dyskeratosis congenita); and infections caused by EBV, cytomegalovirus, HIV/AIDS, bacteria, protozoa, fungi and SARS-CoV-2. Secondary HLH may also result from iatrogenic causes such as bone marrow or other organ transplantations; chemotherapy; or therapy with immunosuppressing agents.

About 33% of all HLH cases, ~75% of Asian HLH cases, and nearly 100% of HLH cases caused by mutations in SH2D1A (see X-linked lymphoproliferative disease type 1) are associated with, and thought to be triggered or promoted by, EBV infection. These cases of HLH are classified as belonging to the class of Epstein–Barr virus–associated lymphoproliferative diseases and termed EBV+ HLH.

=== Genetics ===
Five genetic subtypes (FHL1, FHL2, FHL3, FHL4, and FHL5) are described, with an estimated overall prevalence of one in 50,000 and equal gender distribution. Molecular genetic testing for four of the causative genes, PRF1 (FHL2), UNC13D (FHL3), STX11 (FHL4), and STXBP2 (FHL5), is available on a clinical basis. Symptoms of FHL are usually evident within the first few months of life and may even develop in utero. However, symptomatic presentation throughout childhood and even into young adulthood has been observed in some cases.

The five subtypes of FHL are each associated with a specific gene:

- FHL1: HPLH1
- FHL2: PRF1 (Perforin)
- FHL3: UNC13D (Munc13-4)
- FHL4: STX11 (Syntaxin 11)
- FHL5: STXBP2 (Syntaxin binding protein 2)/UNC18-2

Nearly half of the cases of type 2 familial hemophagocytic lymphohistiocytosis are due to bi-allelic PRF1 mutations.

== Pathophysiology ==
The underlying causes, either inherited or acquired, lead to an unchecked immune response when exposed to triggers. Impaired NK-cell cytotoxicity is the hallmark of HLH. Normally, NK cells inhibit CD8 T cells to terminate the immune response after the infectious agent is destroyed. All genetic defects for familial HLH are related to granule-dependent cytotoxicity. This inability to remove infected and antigen-presenting cells and terminate the immune response leads to uncontrolled proliferation and activation of the immune system with the release of excessive cytokines. These cells then infiltrate organs, releasing more cytokines, which gives the clinical picture. The fever is caused by IL-1, IL-6 and TNF-alpha; the cytopenia is due to the suppressive effect on hematopoiesis by TNF-alpha and TNF-gamma. TNF-alpha and TNF-gamma may also lead to inhibition of lipoprotein lipase or stimulate triglyceride synthesis. Activated macrophages secrete ferritin and plasminogen activator leading to hyperfibrinolysis which leads to excessive bleeding.

== Diagnosis ==
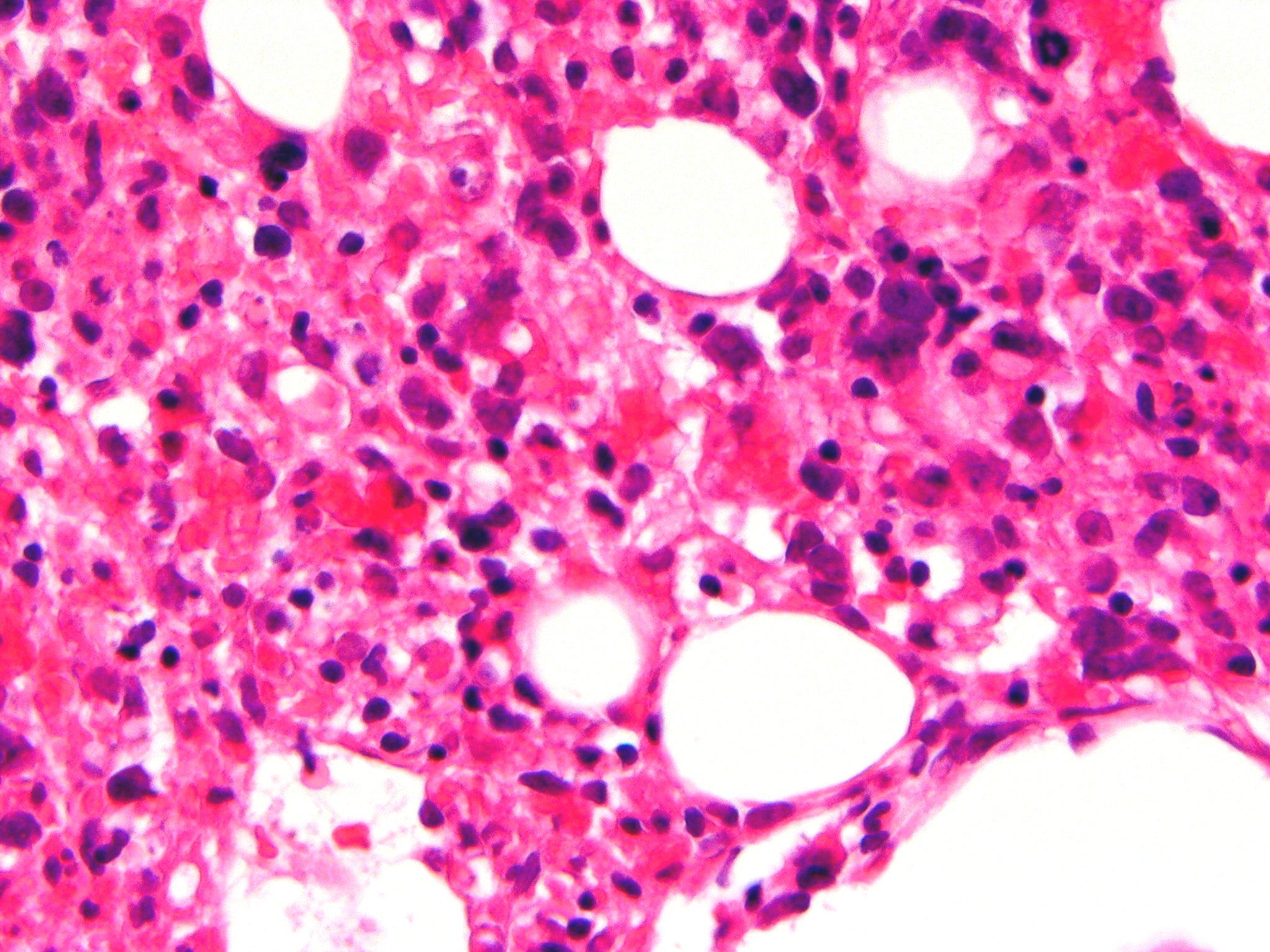
Light microscopic image of bone marrow showing stromal macrophages containing numerous red blood cells in their cytoplasm

The blood count typically shows decreased numbers of blood cells—including a decreased number of circulating red blood cells, white blood cells, and platelets. The bone marrow may show hemophagocytosis. The liver enzymes (alanine amino transferase and aspartate amino transferase) are usually abnormal.

Inflammatory markers, including the serum C reactive protein, erythrocyte sedimentation rate, and ferritin levels are markedly elevated. In children, ferritin levels above 10000 μg/L are very sensitive and specific for the diagnosis of HLH, however, the diagnostic utility for ferritin is less for adult HLH patients.

The serum fibrinogen level is usually low and the D-dimer level is elevated due to hyperfibrinolysis.

The sphingomyelinase is elevated.

Bone marrow biopsy shows histiocytosis.

=== Classification ===
Secondary HLH occurs after strong immunologic activation, such as that which can occur with systemic infection, immunodeficiency, or underlying malignancy.

An atypical presentation of primary HLH, where the inflammation is limited to the central nervous system, has been described.

=== Diagnostic criteria ===
The current (2004) diagnostic criteria for HLH are:

1. A molecular diagnosis consistent with HLH. These include the identification of pathologic mutations of PRF1, UNC13D, or STX11.

OR

2. Fulfillment of five out of the eight criteria below:

- Fever (defined as a temperature >100.3 °F, >38 °C)
- Enlargement of the spleen
- Decreased blood cell counts affecting at least two of three lineages in the peripheral blood:
  - Haemoglobin <9 g/100 ml (in infants <4 weeks: haemoglobin <10 g/100 ml) (anemia)
  - Platelets <100 billion/L (thrombocytopenia)
  - Neutrophils <1 billion/L (neutropenia)
- High blood levels of triglycerides (fasting, greater than or equal to 265 mg/100 ml) and/or decreased amounts of fibrinogen in the blood (≤ 150 mg/100 ml)
- Ferritin ≥ 500 ng/ml
- Haemophagocytosis in the bone marrow, spleen or lymph nodes
- Low or absent natural killer cell activity
- Soluble CD25 (soluble IL-2 receptor) >2400 U/ml (or per local reference laboratory)

Despite the disorder's name, hemophagocytosis is not required to be present for the diagnosis. It may not be present in early stages of the disordered inflammation.

Not all five out of eight criteria are required for diagnosis of HLH in adults, and a high index of suspicion is required for diagnosis, as delay results in increased mortality. The diagnostic criteria were developed in pediatric populations and have not been validated for adult HLH patients. Attempts to improve diagnosis of HLH have included use of the HScore, which can be used to estimate an individual's risk of HLH. In adults, soluble IL-2 receptor has been found to be a very sensitive marker for HLH, demonstrating 100% sensitivity for ruling out HLH below a cutoff of 2400 U/mL and optimal cutoff for ruling in at 2515 U/mL (sensitivity, 100%; specificity, 72.5%), with 93% specificity at >10 000 U/mL.

The HLH-2004 diagnostic criteria or the HS score can diagnose secondary HLH with a sensitivity of 95% and specificity of 93.6%.

=== Differential diagnosis ===
The differential diagnosis of HLH includes secondary HLH and macrophage-activation syndrome or other primary immunodeficiencies that present with hemophagocytic lymphohistiocytosis, such as X-linked lymphoproliferative disease.

Other conditions that may be confused with this condition include autoimmune lymphoproliferative syndrome. As a syndrome of intense inflammation, it needs to be differentiated from sepsis, which may be extremely challenging.

Those with Griscelli syndrome with mutations in the gene encoding the RAB27A protein (which is involved in regulation of the immune system by giving the ability for T-cells to destroy pathogens) are at high risk of developing HLH.

== Treatment ==
The HLH-94 study is the most extensive study regarding the treatment of primary and secondary HLH and is endorsed by the Histiocyte Society. The society has published guidelines based on the HLH-94 study. Treatment for primary and secondary HLH involves immunosuppressive therapy and cytotoxic therapy meant to inhibit T-cells. Treatment primarily involves etoposide which induces apoptosis (programmed cell death) of T-cells for up to 8 weeks combined with the steroid immunosuppressant dexamethasone. This combination treatment will cause a depletion of pro-inflammatory T-cells and is then followed by a hematopoietic stem cell transplantation (HSCT) in those with primary (familial) disease, and relapsing or persistent disease. Cyclosporin is sometimes used as an immunosuppressive treatment in the initial stage of therapy. For those with secondary HLH, treatment involves the steroids and T-cell inhibitors combined with a treatment of the underlying cause of the hyperinflammatory reaction. For those with secondary HLH, immunosuppression and cytotoxic T-cell inhibitory therapy can be stopped after 8 weeks followed by a monitoring period (to see if disease relapses or persists).

In those with neurological symptoms or abnormal findings on a spinal fluid analysis via lumbar puncture, cyclophosphamide can be injected directly into the cerebrospinal fluid. Etoposide can also cross the blood brain barrier which helps in brain or spinal cord disease.

Emapalumab (an anti-interferon monoclonal antibody) or anakinra (a modified recombinant interleukin 1 receptor antagonist) plus steroids are sometimes used in HLH.

Methotrexate and vincristine have also been used. However, for secondary HLH, evidence suggests that the benefit of etoposide-based therapy is limited, as it may mask or delay diagnosis of the underlying contributors and increase risk of toxicity. Cytokine targeted therapy, which is less toxic, could be a more rational approach to treat inflammation while not interfering with the identification of underlying causes of secondary HLH.

People with HLH may need intensive therapy. Therefore, HLH should be included in the differential diagnosis of intensive care unit patients with cytopenia and hyperferritinemia. Patients in the earlier stages of HLH are frequently hospitalized at internal medicine wards.

== Prognosis ==
Based on the large HLH-94 trial, HLH has an estimated survival of 54% at 5 years. The familial type has a 50% survival rate at 5 years. The 5-year survival rate increased to 66% in those who had a stem cell transplant after medical therapy. Poor prognostic factors included HLH associated with malignancy, with half the patients dying by 1.4 months compared to 22.8 months for non-tumour associated HLH patients. Other estimates show that secondary HLH associated with malignancy has a 20-30% survival rate at 2 years.

Secondary HLH in some individuals may be self-limited because patients can fully recover after having received only supportive medical treatment (i.e., IV immunoglobulin only). However, long-term remission without the use of cytotoxic and immunosuppressive therapies is unlikely in the majority of adults with HLH and in those with involvement of the central nervous system (brain and/or spinal cord).

== History ==
The first case report of HLH was published in 1939 under the term "Histiocytic Medullary Reticulosis". A second report would come out in 1952 that would rename the disorder that same year. Development of higher immune effector cell-associated hemophagocytic lymphohistiocytsis-like syndrome (IEC-HS) was observed in phase 1 clinical trails of the therapeutic CRG-023 developed by Cargo Therapeutics. In this study, 18% of participants developed IEC-HS, and an undisclosed number of patients died.

== Research ==
A 2018 systematic review of dengue-associated HLH cases reported pooled proportions in presentations of fever 97.2%, hepatomegaly 70.2%, splenomegaly 78.4%, thrombocytopenia 90.1%, anemia 76.0%, and serum ferritin ≥500 μg/L 97.1%. The case fatality rate was 14.6% among dengue HLH patients.

== See also ==
- Emperipolesis
- X-linked lymphoproliferative disease § XLP2
