= Emapalumab =

Monoclonal antibody

Monoclonal antibody
- Type: Whole antibody
- Source: Human
- Target: IFN-gamma

Clinical data
- Pronunciation: /ˈɛməpəlˌuməb/ EM-a-PAL-eu-mab
- Trade names: Gamifant
- Other names: NI-0501, emapalumab-lzsg
- AHFS/Drugs.com: Monograph
- MedlinePlus: a619024
- License data: US DailyMed: Emapalumab
- Routes of administration: Intravenous
- ATC code: L04AG09 (WHO)

Legal status
- Legal status: US: ℞-only

Identifiers
- CAS Number: 1709815-23-5
- DrugBank: DB14724
- ChemSpider: none
- UNII: 3S252O2Z4X
- KEGG: D11120

Chemical and physical data
- Formula: C_{6430}H_{9898}N_{1718}O_{2038}S_{46}
- Molar mass: 145352.66 g·mol^{−1}

Emapalumab, sold under the brand name Gamifant, is an anti-interferon-gamma (IFNγ) antibody medication used for the treatment of hemophagocytic lymphohistiocytosis (HLH), which has no cure.

The most common side effects include infections, hypertension, infusion-related reactions, and pyrexia.

The U.S. Food and Drug Administration (FDA) considers it to be a first-in-class medication.

In June 2025, the U.S. Food and Drug Administration (FDA) approved emapalumab-lzsg for the treatment of macrophage activation syndrome (MAS) in patients with Still’s disease.

== Medical uses ==
Emapalumab is used to treat primary hemophagocytic lymphohistiocytosis (HLH) with refractory, recurrent or progressive disease or intolerance with conventional HLH therapy.

== Adverse effects ==
In the clinical trials that lead to emapalumab's FDA approval, the most commonly reported adverse effects were infections (56%), high blood pressure (41%), infusion reactions (27%), and fever (24%). Serious adverse effects occurred in about half of the subjects studied in the clinical trial that led to its FDA approval.

== Pharmacology ==
=== Mechanism of action ===
In the setting of HLH, over-secretion of IFN-γ is thought to contribute to the pathogenesis of the disease. Emapalumab binds and neutralizes IFN-γ, preventing it from inducing pathological effects.

=== Pharmacokinetics ===
Like other antibody-based medications, which are made of amino acid chains called polypeptides, emapalumab is broken down into smaller peptides via the body's normal catabolism.

== Society and culture ==
=== Legal status ===
The U.S. Food and Drug Administration (FDA) granted orphan drug designations in 2010 and 2020, and breakthrough therapy designation in 2016, on the basis of preliminary data from the phase II trial.

In July 2020, and again in November 2020, the European Medicines Agency (EMA) recommended the refusal of the marketing authorization for emapalumab.

In June 2025, the FDA approved emapalumab-lzsg for the treatment of macrophage activation syndrome (MAS) in patients with Still’s disease.

== Research ==
The research name of emapalumab was NI-0501. A phase II/III trial began in 2013 and is ongoing as of August 2018. The trial targets patients under the age of 18 who have failed to improve on conventional treatments. This study was realised in the context of an EU-funded FP7 project, named FIGHT-HLH (306124).
