= Juvenile idiopathic arthritis =

Childhood rheumatic disease

- Other names: Juvenile arthritis, juvenile rheumatoid arthritis
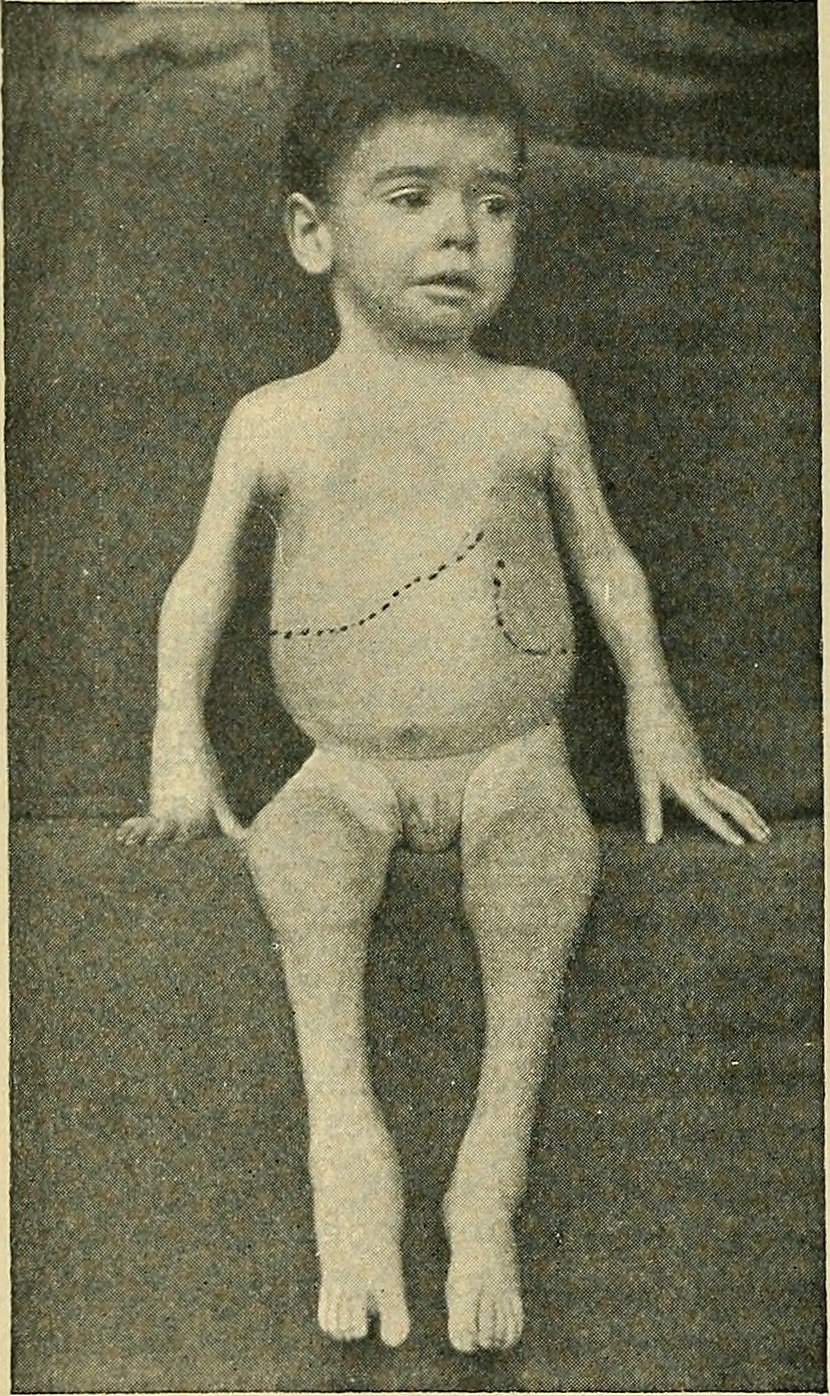
- A 3-year-old boy with JIA, arthritis is shown as swelling of the joints (elbows, wrists, knees and ankles) with organ enlargement; the dashed lines showing the palpable edges of the liver and spleen
- Specialty: Rheumatology
- Differential diagnosis: Amplified musculoskeletal pain syndrome
- Prevalence: 3.8-400 in 100,000

Juvenile idiopathic arthritis (JIA), also known as juvenile arthritis and formerly known as juvenile rheumatoid arthritis (JRA), is the most common chronic rheumatic disease of childhood, affecting approximately 3.8 to 400 out of 100,000 children. Juvenile refers to disease onset before 16 years of age, while idiopathic refers to a condition with no defined cause, and arthritis is inflammation within the joint.

JIA is an autoimmune, noninfective, inflammatory joint disease, the cause of which remains poorly understood. It is characterised by chronic joint inflammation. JIA is a subset of childhood arthritis, but unlike other, more transient forms of childhood arthritis, JIA is a lifelong condition with relapse of disease after treatment discontinuation being common. JIA has clinical and pathologic correlates to adult inflammatory and auto-immune arthritis, with the diseases believed to exist on a continuum from childhood to adulthood. There are six biologically and clinically distinct forms of JIA: oligoarticular JIA, rheumatoid factor negative polyarticular JIA, rheumatoid factor positive polyarticular JIA, enthesitis-related arthritis, psoriatic JIA and systemic JIA. A definitive diagnostic test for JIA is lacking: diagnosis is made clinically by a combination of laboratory and clinical factors. Cancer and other auto-immune or inflammatory conditions are usually considered.

The prognosis for children with JIA has improved dramatically over recent decades, particularly with the introduction of biological therapies and a shift towards more aggressive treatment strategies. JIA treatment aims for normal physical and psychosocial functioning, which is an achievable goal for some children with this condition.

== Signs and symptoms ==
Arthritis entails inflammation within the joint, and presents as swelling, pain, stiffness and restricted joint movement. Symptoms of JIA vary. This is because JIA has several subtypes, which differ according to the number of affected joints, severity of disease, age of onset, prognosis and presence or absence of inflammation in other parts of the body.

The key clinical feature in JIA is persistent swelling of the affected joints. Any joint can be affected, but large joints such as the knee and ankle are most commonly involved. Involvement of small joints of the hands and feet is more likely when many joints are affected ('polyarthritis'). Swollen joints may also feel warmer to touch. Swelling may be difficult to detect clinically, especially for joints such as those of the spine, sacroiliac joints, shoulder, hip, and jaw.

Joint pain is an important symptom, although some children experience minimal or no pain with their arthritis. In these children, the first sign of arthritis may be limping, especially in the morning.

Swelling and pain usually result in limited movement of the affected joints, for example a knee held bent causing a limp, or being unable to make a full fist. Limited movement may reduce a child's ability to fully participate in activities and undertake usual tasks such as those used for self-care. In some JIA subtypes, more non-specific symptoms of being unwell may be present, such as lethargy, fatigue and poor appetite. Children with systemic JIA usually present with fever and a classic rash and may become quite ill. Late effects of arthritis can include joint contractures (stiff, bent joints with loss of movement) due to joint damage; limb length discrepancies and muscle wasting with muscle weakness.

=== Extra-articular ===
JIA is associated with inflammation in the front of the eye (acute or chronic anterior uveitis), which affects about one in six children with JIA. Eye involvement occurs most commonly in girls, those with only a few joints involved (oligoarthritis), those with rheumatoid factor negative polyarticular JIA, and those with a positive anti-nuclear antibody (ANA). Girls younger than six years old are at greatest risk of anterior uveitis. 90% of chronic anterior uveitis occurs within 4 years of JIA diagnosis. Acute anterior uveitis is seen in 11-13% of JIA and is more commonly associated with the enthesitis related arthritis subtype. It presents with light sensitivity, redness of the eyes and eye pain. Regular eye exams are required for children affected by acute or chronic anterior uveitis related to JIA.

Children with the Systemic JIA subtype often experience extra-articular manifestations including fever, rash, enlarged lymph nodes, enlarged liver or spleen, serositis and anemia.

=== Complications ===
JIA is a chronic disorder, which if neglected, can lead to serious complications. However, with regular follow-up and modern treatments, complications have reduced and outcomes improved. If inflammation is not treated, it can damage the joint, the cartilage and the bone. With the advent of modern therapies, these complications of JIA have become much less common.

Children with JIA may have a reduced overall rate of growth, especially if the disease involves many joints or other body systems. This may be due to a combination of the disease itself, as well as its treatments, particularly corticosteroid use. Paradoxically, limbs where a large joint (such as the knee) is inflamed may have increased growth in the short term, leading to limb-length discrepancy (i.e. one arm or leg is slightly longer than the other). This is due to increased blood supply to the bony growth plates surrounding the inflamed joints. Bone density and bone strength may be reduced through a combination of inflammation, corticosteroid use and reduced physical activity levels.

Uveitis, if left untreated, can result in scarring, glaucoma, cataracts, and even blindness. Regular monitoring allows for early detection and treatment. Steroid eye drops are usually the first line treatment for anterior uveitis. However, other treatments – many of which also treat arthritis (e.g. methotrexate, biologics) – may be required to keep the inflammation under control, and to minimise steroid use over the longer term. Long term steroid use can contribute to the development of cataracts.

Macrophage activation syndrome (MAS) is a severe, potentially life-threatening complication that can occur in patients with the systemic subtype of JIA. MAS involves uncontrolled activation of the immune system, which can present with a sepsis-like picture of fever, rash, enlarged liver and spleen, enlarged lymph nodes and cardiorespiratory compromise.

== Causes ==
The cause of JIA remains unknown. However, the disorder is autoimmune — meaning that the body's own immune system starts to attack and destroy cells and tissues (particularly in the joints) for no apparent reason. The immune system is thought to be provoked by changes in the environment, in combination with mutations in many associated genes and/or other causes of differential expression of genes. Experimental studies have shown that certain mutated viruses may be able to trigger JIA. The disease appears to be more common in girls, and is most common in Caucasians.

The cause of JIA, as the word "idiopathic" suggests, is unknown and an area of active research. Current understanding of JIA suggests that it arises in a genetically susceptible individual due to environmental factors.

== Diagnosis ==
The diagnosis of JIA can be difficult, in part because joint pain in children is so common and may be from many causes other than JIA. The characteristic feature of arthritis is joint swelling which is sometimes – but not always – associated with pain. The presence of joint stiffness is another typical feature, particularly when present in the morning and improving with activity.

No single test can confirm a diagnosis of JIA: a combination of presenting signs and symptoms, blood tests, and if necessary medical imaging, is used to make the diagnosis. The blood tests may measure levels of inflammatory markers, as well as the presence of specific immune markers which may include anti-nuclear antibody, HLA-B27, rheumatoid factor and anti–citrullinated protein antibody. These serological markers may be negative in children with JIA, and are often present in healthy children; as such they should not be interpreted in isolation but in the context of the clinical presentation. Many children with JIA have normal blood work. X-rays may be required to ensure that the joint pain and swelling is not from a fracture, cancer, infection, or congenital abnormality. In some cases, fluid from the joint can be aspirated and analysed to assist in making a diagnosis. This test can assist by ruling out other causes of arthritis such as infection.

=== Classification ===
The current classification system by the International League of Associations for Rheumatology (ILAR) recognizes seven distinct subtypes of JIA, based on their presentation within the first six months: Each subtype has a specific pattern of features as outlined in the table and descriptions below. (The seventh category, not included in the table, is 'Undifferentiated' and includes any patient with JIA who does not meet criteria for other subtypes, or who meets criteria for two or more subtypes).

| | Oligoarticular | Polyarticular (RF negative) | Polyarticular (RF positive) | Systemic Onset | Psoriatic | Enthesitis Related Arthritis |
|---|---|---|---|---|---|---|
| % of JIA | 50-60 | 20-30 | 5-10 | 10-20 | 5-15 | 15 |
| Gender (F:M) | 4:1 | 4:1 | 9:1 | 1:1 | 3:2 | 1:9 |
| Typical age of onset (years) | 2-12 (peak 2–3) | 2-12 (peak 2–3) | Adolescence | Any | Mid childhood | Adolescence |
| Joint Pattern | Asymmetric; often large joints (knee, ankle, wrist, elbow) | Often asymmetric; multiple small and large joints | Symmetric; multiple small and large joints | Symmetric; multiple small and large joints | Asymmetric; small and large joints including hips and especially DIPs | Asymmetric; large joints; axial skeleton |
| Extra-articular Involvement | Uveitis in 20% | Painless uveitis (especially if ANA positive) | Rheumatoid Nodules | Fever, rash, lymphadenopathy, enlarged liver and spleen, Serositis | Psoriasis, nail pitting, dactylitis, uveitis in 10%, enthesitis | Symptomatic uveitis in 20%, enthesitis, IBD, aortitis |

==== Oligoarticular arthritis (Oligoarthritis) ====
Oligoarticular (or pauciarticular) JIA is the most common JIA subtype, and occurs when there are up to four joints involved during the first six months of disease. Two subtypes of oligoarticular arthritis exist: persistent oligoarthritis, where no more than four joints are affected throughout the whole disease course; and extended oligoarthritis, where more than four joints are affected after the first six months of disease. Patients in this subtype are often young, typically aged between 1 and 5 years, and are female preponderant. The most commonly involved joint is the knee, but other affected joints may include the ankles, wrists, elbows, and others. 50% of cases involve mono-arthritis, only involving the knee. The anti-nuclear antigen (ANA) is positive in up to 80% of patients with oligoarthritis and is associated with a higher risk of associated eye disease (uveitis), particularly in younger patients. There is no adult counterpart disease to oligoarticular JIA. The prefixes oligo- and pauci- mean 'few'.

=== Differential diagnosis ===
Several other disorders and diseases present themselves with symptoms like JIA. These causes include, but are not limited to, infectious (for example, septic arthritis or osteomyelitis) and post-infectious conditions (reactive arthritis, acute rheumatic fever, and in some geographic areas Lyme disease); hematologic and neoplastic diseases such as leukemia or bony tumors; and other connective tissue diseases (such as systemic lupus erythematosus). For the systemic-onset form of JIA, the differential diagnosis also includes Kawasaki disease and periodic fever syndromes. Some genetic skeletal dysplasias, such as forms of mucopolysaccharidosis, especially type 1 Scheie syndrome, progressive pseudo-rheumatoid dysplasia, and multicentric osteolysis, nodulosis, and arthropathy syndrome may also mimic JIA, as they may present with joint swelling, joint restriction, stiffness, and pain. The clinical and radiologic overlap between genetic skeletal dysplasias and JIA can be great that molecular analysis may be needed to confirm the diagnosis. Rarely, metabolic diseases, such as Farber disease, may also mimic JIA. Patients with Farber disease typically have subcutaneous nodules and a hoarse or weak voice due to laryngeal nodules.

== Treatment ==
The major emphasis of the treatment of JIA is helping the child or young person regain normal levels of physical and social functioning by controlling inflammation and extra-articular symptoms. Clinical remission should be the primary target for all people. Prompt recognition and management is important as early initiation of medication therapy increases the likelihood of a response to first-line treatments and low disability. Consensus treatment guidelines exist for the treatment of JIA.

Optimal management of JIA requires a multidisciplinary team working to address the needs of an individual child. Optimizing physical and social functioning is accomplished using non-pharmacological strategies such as physical therapies, pain management strategies, and social supports. Medications are used to control inflammation and reduce or prevent extra-articular symptoms.Non-steroidal anti-inflammatory drugs (NSAIDs) are used for symptomatic relief of joint pain in children with JIA. Disease-modifying antirheumatic drugs (DMARDs), which inhibit specific pathways in the inflammation pathways responsible for JIA, are a primary treatment. Lifelong DMARD treatment is often required, and drug-free remission is exceedingly rare.

Oligoarticular JIA (which comprises 40-50% of all JIA cases) by definition involves 4 or fewer joints in the first 6 months of the disease. After 6 months, some cases become polyarticular (involving more than 4 joints). This polyarticular subtype is associated with a lower remission rate with medical therapy. Intra-articular steroid injections often help with treatment in oligoarticular JIA. Conventional synthetic DMARDs, such as methotrexate are a first-line therapy, and biologic DMARDs such as TNF-α inhibitors may be added on for refractory cases.

Rheumatoid factor-negative polyarticular JIA (15-20% of all JIA cases) can be treated with synthetic conventional DMARDs (such as methotrexate), with biologic DMARDs (such as TNF inhibitors) being a second-line add-on treatment option.

Rheumatoid factor-positive JIA (5% of JIA cases, and also being rare in children younger than 9-years old) is associated with a poor prognosis, and early treatment is required to prevent significant joint destruction and disability. Similar pathophysiology can be applied to adult rheumatoid arthritis. Early therapy with combination of methotrexate and DMARDs was shown to improve disease activity and reduce remission when compared to either therapy alone. Synthetic conventional DMARDs or biologic DMARDs are standard therapy for this type of JIA.

Enthesitis-related arthritis is a type of JIA characterized by enthesitis; inflammation of the area where tendons and ligaments attach to bone. NSAIDs are commonly used for symptomatic relief, with the anti-inflammatories sulfasalazine and TNF inhibitors also being used. Biologic DMARDs such as TNF-α inhibitors are used for sacroilitis (inflammation of the sacroiliac joint). IL-17 inhibitors are used for refractory disease. 40-60% of children with enthesitis-related variant of JIA have involvement of the axial skeleton, including sacroiliitis, spondyloarthritis, and ankylosing spondylitis (inflammation of the spine).

Psoriatic JIA typically presents in children between the ages of 2-4 and 10 and up, having a bi-modal age of onset. 50% of children with psoriatic JIA develop psoriasis. Adolescents and older children have a similar presentation to psoriatic arthritis (the adult continuation of this type of JIA). Treatment consists of synthetic DMARDs such as methotrexate or TNF-α inhibitors. DMARDs targeting inflammatory cytokines IL-17, IL-12, or IL-23 may be used.

Systemic JIA is characterized by markedly elevated inflammatory markers, fevers, and rashes. It may also present as lymph node swelling, hepatosplenomegaly (swelling of the liver and spleen), and as a life-threatening hyperinflammation syndrome known as macrophage activation syndrome. Early treatment with IL-1 and IL-6 inhibitors may induce remission. DMARDs combined with systemic steroids may be needed in severe inflammation or macrophage activation syndrome. Systemic JIA is pathologically similar to Adult-Onset Still's Disease, and this is thought to be the adult continuation of the same disease.

=== Extra-articular complications ===
Extra-articular complications (in which inflammation affects other organs or areas of the body other than the joints) is very common in JIA. Chronic anterior uveitis (inflammation of the anterior portion of the eye) is seen in 20-30% of children with oligoarticular JIA. RF-negative polyarticular JIA and psoriatic JIA also often have chronic anterior uveitis. Girls younger than 6-years old with positive ANA (Anti-nuclear antibodies) are at the highest risk, and 90% of cases occur within 4 years of JIA onset. Acute anterior uveitis occurs in 11-13% of patients with JIA, most commonly in the enthesitis related variant of JIA. It is associated with light sensitivity, conjunctivitis and eye pain. Treatment consists of steroid eye drops and systemic DMARDs. Both acute and chronic anterior uveitis require regular eye exams to monitor for complications.

Macrophage activation syndrome is an acute hyperinflammatory complication of JIA that is life treatening. It is a type of acquired hemophagocytic lymphohistiocytosis that is triggered by hyperinflammation of rheumatologic diseases such as JIA. It occurs in 10% of JIA patients. It is treated by interferon-γ inhibitors, interleukin-1 (IL-1) inhibitors and systemic steroids.

=== Non-pharmacological treatments ===
A multi-disciplinary care team is often used in the treatment of JIA.

One of the ways occupational or physical therapists help young children with JIA is by developing a home therapy program based around play. Exercises are prescribed by both physical therapists and occupational therapists to increase the range a child can move a joint, to strengthen the muscles around a joint, to decrease pain and stiffness and to prevent further limitations in their joint movements. OTs and PTs can provide children with age-appropriate games and activities to allow the children to practice their exercises while playing and socializing with friends. Examples are crafts, swimming, and sports.

Surgery is only used to treat the most severe cases of JIA and is now rarely required.

==== Physical therapy and exercise ====
Maintaining physical activity is important in all children, but especially for children with JIA. Physical therapists can work with children with JIA to improve muscle strength, balance and other functional outcomes.

Arthritis in childhood can be associated with muscle weakness and wasting around the affected joints. It can also lead to low bone density, which may predispose to osteoporosis and fractures in adulthood. Getting regular exercise is an important part of the management of JIA to promote bone and muscle health.

There is variation in the exact exercise prescription which best promotes musculoskeletal health whilst reducing fatigue, pain and swelling. Consensus is that children with JIA should be following national public health standards of physical activity and participating in moderate fitness, flexibility, and strengthening exercises, compatible with their abilities and disease restrictions. Current physical activity guidelines for children recommend at least 60 minutes of moderate to vigorous activity daily, including vigorous activity on at least three days per week. Although research highlights the benefits of various forms of physical activity for improving health outcomes in children JIA, many parents and children remain hesitant that exercise may worsen symptoms. This fear, combined with the lack of clear exercise guidance in clinical settings, creates uncertainty and hesitation about appropriate PA recommendations. Encouraging healthy habits early in life and addressing fear-avoidance behaviors in children with JIA can enhance both musculoskeletal and cardiovascular health.

A Cochrane meta-analysis looking at existing RCTs showed in all studies that exercise does not have a detrimental effect on JIA. In fact, there is evidence to show that both low and high-intensity exercise programs result in improved physical function and reduced pain in children with JIA. Guidelines indicate that children with JIA should be encouraged to be physically active and can safely participate in sports without disease exacerbation. Those with actively inflamed joints should limit activities within pain limits, then gradually return to full activity following a disease flare. Studies found that a 12-week exercise program of weight-bearing exercise plus standardized muscle strengthening exercises for children with JIA led to significant improvements in bone mineral density, bringing measurements for children with JIA within the reference range of healthy children.

It may be necessary to use aids like splints or casts to correct biomechanics, but prolonged splinting and casting are now rarely indicated for children with JIA. Joint injections of steroids may be helpful for children with JIA.

==== Self-management ====
Pain is the most common and often the most distressing symptom of JIA (although some children with JIA do have joint inflammation without any pain at all). Pain can occur even when children are receiving effective doses of therapies which are managing their underlying disease. A multinational study showed that pain is a predictor of psycho-social well-being. Several studies has also shown that pain at debut is a strong predictor of persistent pain.

Pain has been found to negatively impact all aspects of quality of life and is associated with a reduction in physical, social and emotional functioning. Children who have higher levels of pain tend to have reduced levels of socialization, school attendance and participation in activities. Increased pain is also correlated with poor sleep and higher fatigue in children with JIA.

==== Education and employment ====
Educational and vocational accommodations in those with JIA may include requiring extra time to get between classes or during examinations, using specialized pens or switching to typing rather than handwriting, or minimizing the load of heavy books or equipment to be carried in a child's school bag. The exact requirements will vary from child-to-child and will depend on the joints affected. In many instances, the child's treating team will be able to provide specific advice and information for teachers and coaches to smooth the transition back to school.

=== eHealth and mobile Health (mHealth) interventions ===
A new emerging area of support for disease management is through digital technology using eHealth and mobile health (mHealth) interventions. These interventions have to potential to support the development of self-management skills, or assist the healthcare team to monitor symptoms. For JIA, current studies have focused on the health issues pain, health related quality of life, physical activity and disease management. Children and adolescents have used these interventions through a range of devices including computers, laptops, personal digital assistants, multimedia-players, and wearable accelerometers synchronised to smart phone. This allows access to these interventions from home. Early usability studies have been gaining positive feedback by children and adolescents. They are familiar with this type of technology and report liking these interventions. However further research is still needed to understand their full potential in supporting children and adolescents living with complex needs.

== Prognosis ==
The use of DMARDs in the management of JIA have made disease-free remission achievable for the majority of children with JIA. Clinical remission can be defined as the absence of signs and symptoms of inflammatory disease activity, including extra-articular manifestations of the disease. Differentiating subtypes of JIA helps to target treatment and leads to more positive outcomes, however subtype is not the only predictor of JIA outcome. Poor prognostic factors include arthritis of the hip, cervical spine, ankles or wrists; prolonged elevation of inflammatory markers; and radiographic evidence of joint damage including erosions or joint space narrowing. Patients with RF-positive polyarthritis often have worse outcomes associated with more aggressive disease. Despite this, the probability of this subgroup achieving inactive disease at least once within five years was shown to be 90% in a large Canadian study. Research is currently being undertaken into clinical prediction models to allow earlier identification of children who are likely to have a worse prognosis. Compliance with therapy, especially medications, has a positive correlation with disease outcome. Disease recurrence after medical therapy discontinuation is high, with 30-100% of children having clinical relapse of disease after treatment discontinuation.

It has been previously suggested that children with JIA are at an increased risk of malignancies when being treated with anti-TNF therapy. More recent data has not confirmed this association: it is thought that the disease itself is linked with a slightly higher background risk of malignancy. Ongoing data analysis on large patient populations continues in this area.

== Epidemiology ==
Juvenile Idiopathic Arthritis is the most common chronic rheumatic disease of childhood. In high-income countries, yearly incidence has been estimated at 2–20 cases per 100,000 population; prevalence in these areas is estimated at 16–150 cases per 100,000 population. However, there is also a suggestion that these numbers underestimate disease prevalence: one community-based survey of school children in Western Australia reported a prevalence of 400 per 100,000. Overall prevalence is often reported as one per thousand children.

Incidence and prevalence data vary across different population and ethnic groups, with lower overall prevalence in Afro-Caribbean and Asian populations. There are also ethnic differences in the frequency of JIA subtypes: for example, oligoarthritis is the most common subtype in European populations, whilst polyarticular disease predominates in many other countries including Costa Rica, India, New Zealand, and South Africa.

== Terminology ==
The terminology used to describe JIA is evolving, and each term has some limitations.

Previous terminology included Juvenile Rheumatoid Arthritis and Juvenile Chronic Arthritis. These terms were replaced in 1997 with the release of the revised ILAR (International League of Associations for Rheumatology) classification criteria.

There is currently an international movement underway to further revise the classification criteria for JIA, although this is in a preliminary phase.

MeSH uses "juvenile arthritis" as the primary entry, and uses "idiopathic", "chronic" and "rheumatoid" in alternate entries.

== Society ==
Some famous people with this condition are:

- Antoni Gaudi, architect
- Clark Middleton, actor
- Claire Cottrill, singer-songwriter
- Rosemary Sutcliff, author
- Mai Mihara, figure skater
