= Childhood arthritis =

- Other names: Pediatric rheumatic disease
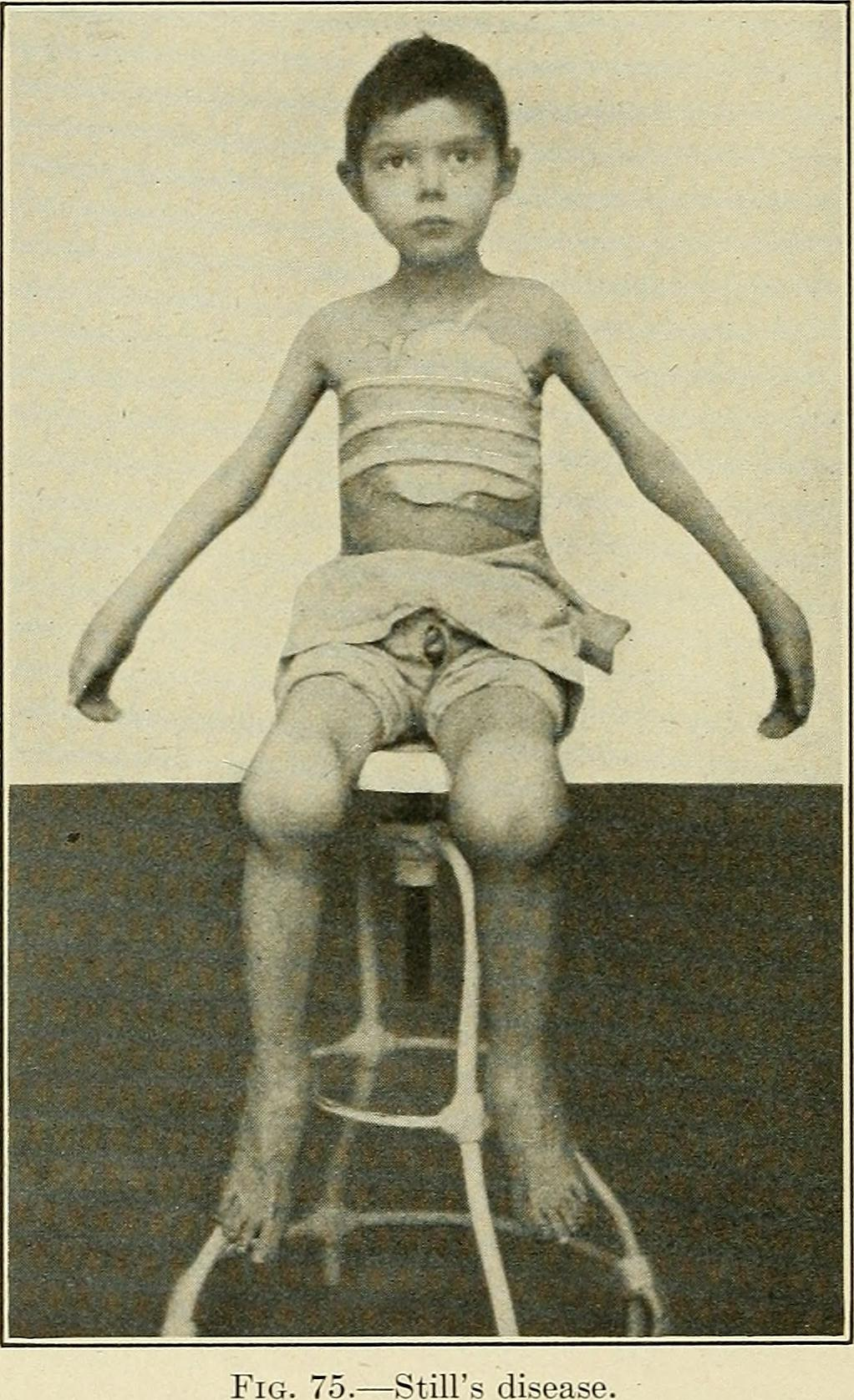
- A child with Still disease, otherwise known as systemic juvenile idiopathic arthritis
- Specialty: Rheumatology

Childhood arthritis (pediatric rheumatic disease) is an umbrella term used to describe any rheumatic disease or chronic arthritis-related condition which affects individuals under the age of 16. There are several subtypes that differentiate themselves via prognosis, complications, and treatments. Most types are autoimmune disorders, where an individual's immune system may attack its own healthy tissues and cells.

Diagnosis of juvenile idiopathic arthritis is typically considered for children that are below the age of 16 years old and currently experiencing arthritis for at least six weeks with no other evident alternative causes for the symptoms. In 1997 the International League of Associations for Rheumatology (ILAR) presented a classification of juvenile idiopathic arthritis. This was later revised in 2001. In this classification juvenile idiopathic arthritis is the umbrella term and comprises seven categories: systemic arthritis, oligoarthritis, polyarthritis (reumatic factor negative), polyarthritis (reumatic factor positive), psoriatic arthritis, enthesitis related arthritis and undifferntiatied arthritis.

Juvenile arthritis may last for a few months, years, or becomes a lifelong disease that requires treatment as the child becomes an adult. Common complications that can arise include leg-length discrepancy, joint contracture, growth retardation, low bone mineral density, and macrophage activation syndrome.

Some causes or potential risk factors denoting a higher chance of developing childhood arthritis have been identified. However, similar to other autoimmune diseases, the exact cause or mechanism for development is still largely unknown and additional associations are continuously being researched and discovered.

== Signs and symptoms ==
Several types of childhood arthritis exist, including juvenile idiopathic arthritis, juvenile myositis, juvenile lupus, juvenile scleroderma, vasculitis, and fibromyalgia.

The most common type, juvenile idiopathic arthritis (previously known as juvenile rheumatoid arthritis or juvenile chronic arthritis) can be divided into six main forms. The classification is based upon symptoms, number of joints involved and the presence of certain antibodies in the blood. However, some subtypes have overlapping clinical presentation in addition as the child grow older symptoms may change over time. The six subforms of juvenile idiopathic arthritis include:

1. Polyarticular arthritis is the first type of arthritis, which affects about 30–40% of children with arthritis and is more common in girls than boys. This subtype begins later in childhood and could be subdivided into two types: Rheumatoid Factor (RF) negative and RF positive depending on the presence of the RF antibody. Typically five or more joints are affected during the first six months (usually smaller joints such as the hands and feet but many also affect the hips, neck, shoulders and jaw).
2. Oligoarticular (aka pauciarticular) arthritis can be early or late onset and is the second type of arthritis, affecting about 50% of children with juvenile arthritis. It typically affects fewer than four joints, usually the large joints such as knees, ankles, or wrists, during first six months of the disease with the knee being the most frequently affected joint. This type affects fewer than four joints (usually the large joints such as knees, ankles or wrists) and may cause eye inflammation in girls with positive anti-nuclear antibodies. Girls younger than eight are more likely to develop this type of arthritis. This is a mildest form of juvenile arthritis and is considered to be persistent if the individual experience symptoms for more than 6 months, and if five or more joints become affected.
3. Systemic disease is the least common form, with 10–20% of children (boys and girls equally) being affected with limited movement, swelling and pain in at least one joint. A common symptom of this type is a high, spiking fever of 103 °F (39.4 °C) or higher, lasting for weeks or months, and a rash of pale red spots on the chest, thighs or other parts of the body may be visible.
4. Enthesitis-Related Arthritis: children impacted by this subtype has arthritis as well as inflammation caused by tendons and ligaments that have inserted themselves into the none. The most commonly impacted area of the body with this subtype include the hips, knees, and feet.
5. Psoriatic Arthritis: children that is impacted by this type of arthritis has arthritis in addition to psoriasis. The child will experience symptoms such as red, scaly skin patches, as well as inflammation in their toes, fingers, or along the ridges of their fingernails.
6. Undifferentiated arthritis: children that is impacted by this has two or more of the symptoms from any of the arthritis subtypes described above, or the child has symptoms that does not match any.

== Cause ==
The cause of this complex disorder is typically idiopathic which can include multiple genes that affects the humoral and cell-mediated immunity in addition to environmental factors. However, Dietary habits and emotional state seem to have no effect on the disease. In most cases, juvenile arthritis is caused by the body attacking its own healthy cells and tissues, i.e. autoimmunity, causing the joint to become inflamed and stiff. Once the joint has become inflamed and stiff, damage is done to the joint and the growth of the joint may by changed or impaired. The underlying cause in the malfunction of the autoimmune system is unknown, however it is common to see an imbalance or abnormality in regulatory T cell levels in a majority of juvenile arthritis cases. Researchers have found that there is an elevation of cytokines like IL-1 and IL-18 in individuals with systemic juvenile idiopathic arthritis. In juvenile idiopathic arthritis (JIA) individuals, it is theorized that a possible environmental trigger for this condition is an infection due to the discovery of elevated heat shock proteins in JIA patients.

Genetic factors play a significant role in the predisposition to juvenile arthritis. Specific genetic markers, such as HLA (human leukocyte antigen) genes, have been associated with an increased risk of developing the disease. The HLA-DRB1 gene, for example, is linked to rheumatoid arthritis in adults and similar associations have been observed in juvenile arthritis, suggesting a genetic overlap between these conditions. Additionally, variations in genes related to the immune system, such as those involved in the production of cytokines and other inflammatory mediators, may contribute to the susceptibility and severity of the disease.

Environmental factors, while not directly causing juvenile arthritis, can influence its onset and progression. Infections are considered a potential trigger, as certain viral or bacterial infections may activate the immune system in a way that leads to autoimmune reactions in genetically predisposed individuals.Environmental pollutants and toxins have also been suggested to play a role in exacerbating the condition, although more research is needed to establish a clear connection.

Recent studies have also highlighted the potential influence of the gut microbiome on the development and course of juvenile arthritis. The balance of beneficial and harmful bacteria in the gut can affect immune responses and inflammation. Dysbiosis, or an imbalance in the gut microbiota, has been observed in individuals with juvenile arthritis, indicating that gut health may be a contributing factor to the disease. Interventions aimed at restoring a healthy gut microbiome are being explored as potential therapeutic strategies.

Understanding the multifactorial causes of juvenile arthritis is crucial for developing targeted treatments and preventive measures. Ongoing research continues to investigate the complex interactions between genetic predispositions, environmental exposures, and immune system dysfunctions to provide a clearer picture of the disease's etiology.

== Diagnosis ==
Early diagnosis and treatment by a pediatric rheumatologist or a rheumatologist can help manage inflammation, relieve pain, and prevent joint damage. However, it is difficult for doctors to diagnose the disease because there is not a single test that doctors can use to diagnose this disease. Physical exams, laboratory tests (blood and urine), and various forms of imaging like X-rays, ultrasound, CT scan, and MRIs may be some of the tests conducted by a doctor. Doctors may perform some of the following tests to diagnose the condition

- ANA (Antinuclear Antibody) Test: ANA are antibodies that are commonly found in individuals who have autoimmune disease which can be helpful for doctors to diagnose juvenile arthritis since it is an autoimmune disease.
- Joint Aspiration
- Rheumatoid Factor (RF) Test: RF is another type of antibody, but it is more specific than ANA in that it is usually found in individuals with rheumatoid arthritis as well as other rheumatoid disease. The presence of RF in a child's blood test can be indicative for RF-positive polyarticular arthritis

These tests are helpful in determining the type of juvenile idiopathic arthritis that an individual have, in addition the results are also helpful in identifying the complications that the individual could be at risk for.

Furthermore, in order to adequately diagnose the patient for juvenile idiopathic arthritis, a complete patient history with the symptoms and illness as a whole must be taken, consisting of the age of onset, duration, specific joints affected, symptoms, and physical and musculoskeletal examinations as well. Laboratory tests must be taken as well, including the complete blood count, erythrocyte sedimentation rate, C-reactive protein test, as well as the ANA and RF tests as mentioned above. Radiography is also recommended, but this is usually only beneficial in later stages of the disease, since it does not catch early stages of juvenile idiopathic arthritis. Overall, however, MRI's are considered to be the number one choice in terms of observing all the affected joints with adequate contrast observed in the imaging, especially due to its sensitivity.

== Treatment ==
Clinical guidelines provide treatment recommendations dependent on the clinical characteristics. The treatment of most types of juvenile arthritis include medications, physical therapy, splints and in severe cases surgery. The type and intensity of the treatment is largely based upon the subtype and severity of damage of the disease. Guideline-informed pharmacological include intraarticular glucocorticoids, scheduled non-steroidal anti-inflammatory drugs, disease-modifying anti-rheumatic drugs, and interleukin inhibitors, depending on macrophage involvement and if symptoms are localized or systemic.

Intraarticular glucocorticoid injections show clinical benefit in patients with juvenile temporomandibular joint arthritis, polyarticular juvenile arthritis, oligoarticular juvenile arthritis, systemic juvenile arthritis, as well as enthesitis-related arthritis. Specifically, triamcinolone hexacetonide has displayed evidence of the longest duration of resolution in symptoms in all aforementioned juvenile arthritic subtypes. Scheduled dosing of NSAIDs may reduce joint pain and encourage mobility. However, their use is contested among experts, as they provide pain relief without addressing the underlying pathophysiology of the disease. Disease modifying anti-rheumatic drugs, also known as DMARDs, may be orally administered (such as methotrexate) or injected (such as etanercept or tocilizumab). They are often used in autoimmune disorders and have proven clinical efficacy in most subtypes of juvenile arthritis. Due to notable side effects (and in the case of injected DMARDs, cost), DMARDs are often given if intraarticular glucocorticoids are deemed insufficient in controlling the patients’ symptoms.

Periodic tests may be needed for some individuals as a part of their treatment. Potential tests include blood cell count, liver function test, and urine test. The goal of these tests are to assess side effects of the treatments as well as potential drug toxicities that may develop even though an individual is asymptomatic. Importantly, the extent of joint inflammation could be evaluated through clinical exams as well as imagining tests like ultrasound. X-rays and magnetic resonance imaging (MRI) are also useful in tailoring the therapy to an individual's needs as well as to assess the health and growth of the bone.

In rare or more serious cases, surgery may be required as a treatment for juvenile arthritis. Most common causes of those needing surgery are the ineffectiveness of medication to slow the rate of damage or the initial diagnosis of the disease came after a large amount of damage has already been sustained. The most common surgeries for juvenile arthritis include epiphysiodesis, arthrodesis, synovectomy, osteotomy, or arthroplasty.

Children are also encouraged to be involved in extra-curricular activities, such as physical activity when possible, and to live a "normal" life. The goal of physical activity is to expand the child's range of motion without imposing too much stress on their joints. Consistent exercise can reduce both pain and immobility while also improving life quality. Exercise helps to improve symptoms that one with childhood arthritis might be experiencing, by significantly improving the extent to which the body's joints can move and be flexible.

With the duration of the disease being finite, treatment will most likely last as long as the disease persists. In most children, the disease goes into spontaneous remission after a few years. Periodic remissions and exacerbations are characteristics of this disease which often requires frequent therapy changes. Although complete treatment withdrawal is possible after the disease is considered to be "quiet" for 6–12 months or longer, regular physician follow-up is still recommended.

Additionally, emerging research is focusing on the role of the gut microbiome and its potential impact on juvenile arthritis. Studies suggest that certain probiotics and dietary interventions may help in modulating immune responses and reducing inflammation. Complementary therapies, such as acupuncture and massage, are also being explored for their potential benefits in alleviating symptoms and improving quality of life. Psychological support for both the child and their family is crucial, as living with a chronic condition can be challenging. Support groups and counseling can provide emotional relief and coping strategies. Advances in genetic research may also pave the way for more personalized treatment plans in the future, tailoring therapies to the individual’s genetic makeup for more effective management of the disease.

== Prognosis ==
Depending on the severity and the type of juvenile arthritis in addition to treatment time, the prognosis could vary for each individual. Patients with a diagnosis of systemic juvenile idiopathic arthritis, typically known as one of the less common forms, have historically had the highest frequency of remission of their disease state while also being off of any medications. However, patients with polyarticular arthritis, specifically with the Rheumatoid Factor positive subtype, had the lowest frequency of remission off any medications. While many patients experience an overall reduction in permanent damage as a result of juvenile idiopathic arthritis, a quarter of patients still end up entering adulthood (above 18 years old) with active disease not yet in remission, with around half of patients also still taking active medications as treatment.

Furthermore, among patients with a diagnosis of oligoarticular arthritis, affecting around half of the juvenile idiopathic arthritis population, more than half of patients have ended up still on treatment with active disease, and 30% of patients after a 30-year follow-up were observed to still have significant and persistent disease. Evidently, the true assessment of an individual's prognosis strongly correlates with their specific type of juvenile arthritis as well as the specific follow-up times and medications that the patient is currently taking.

== Epidemiology ==
Globally, about 3 million children and young adults are impacted by this disease. In the US it affects about 250,000-294,000 children making it one of the most common groups of childhood diseases. However, due to not having consistent guidelines or criteria for diagnosis, this number is an estimation based on smaller population groups. It is likely that a child with juvenile arthritis has a family member with chronic inflammatory arthritis or other autoimmune disorders such as type I diabetes, inflammatory bowel disease, psoriasis, and other conditions. This is also more common in girls compared to boys. The subtype that is most common is the oligoarticular arthritis.

== Risk factors ==
The exact causes or risks leading to a higher chance of developing childhood arthritis are under research but, at this moment, still largely unknown. Currently, the most likely associations of possible development of childhood arthritis are genetic and environmental factors.

Genetic factors are in two main categories: having some variation in the genes that code for our immune system, such as the HLA complex, or having a direct parent who also has the disease. Various mutations have been associated with a higher chance of developing childhood arthritis, however the exact increase of risk is unknown. The HLA complex proteins also represent a large family of genes, therefore variations tend to occur in these regions. Which specific genes and mutations lead to increased risk of childhood arthritis are still currently being pursued. Those with parents who have the disease, or who are known to have these mutations, have been shown to have a significantly higher risk of developing the disease as well.

Environmental factors are also continuing to be researched in regard to the quantitative increase in risk as well as the different types of factors that may be associated with development of childhood arthritis. A majority of factors are in reference to the very early portion of the child's life, such as infantile hygiene levels or the mode of delivery for the child. Additional associations are various types of infectious viral or bacterial agents or early exposure to antibiotics.

Additional environmental factors that have also been considered a possible cause for concern include exposure during pregnancy and after the baby's birth to cigarette smoke, as well as other tropospheric pollutants, such as ozone (O_{3}), carbon monoxide (CO), nitrogen dioxide (NO_{2}), and sulfur dioxide (SO_{2}). Maternal occupational exposure factors were also considered to be an additional environmental factor that could affect a child's future diagnosis of juvenile idiopathic arthritis, depending on the mother's specific profession; working mothers exposed to fine dust and volatile vapor contributes to the future diagnosis of juvenile idiopathic arthritis for the child later on. This includes exposure to pollution within the home, outdoors, and more generally in the atmosphere as well.

Maternal smoking as well as secondhand smoking exposure both in utero as well as after birth as a whole is an extremely significant factor for juvenile arthritis prevalence, and plays a significant role in the diagnosis of the disease for children. Tropospheric pollution with ozone and other compounds can result in the development of a myriad of autoimmune inflammatory diseases in adults, but studies have indicated its impact on these similar rheumatic diseases in children as well, such as with juvenile idiopathic arthritis.

== Psychosocial Impact ==
Childhood arthritis not only affects the physical health of children but also has significant psychosocial implications. The chronic nature of the disease, frequent medical appointments, and physical limitations can lead to emotional and social challenges. Children with arthritis may experience feelings of isolation, frustration, and anxiety, which can affect their overall quality of life and development.

One major psychosocial impact is the potential for academic challenges. Frequent absences from school due to medical appointments or flare-ups can lead to gaps in learning and difficulties in keeping up with peers. This can result in a need for educational accommodations, such as individualized education plans (IEPs) or 504 plans, to support the child’s learning needs and ensure they have equal access to education.

Social relationships can also be affected. Children with arthritis might find it difficult to participate in physical activities or social events, leading to feelings of exclusion or differentness from their peers. This can impact their self-esteem and social skills. Support groups and peer networks can provide valuable social support, helping children to connect with others who understand their experiences and fostering a sense of community.

Psychological support is crucial for managing these psychosocial challenges. Counseling and therapy can help children and their families cope with the emotional aspects of the disease. Cognitive-behavioral therapy (CBT) has been shown to be effective in helping children manage pain and anxiety associated with arthritis. In addition, family therapy can be beneficial in addressing the impacts on family dynamics and helping parents and siblings understand and support the affected child.

Overall, a comprehensive approach to treating childhood arthritis should include attention to the psychosocial aspects of the disease. Integrating psychological and social support with medical treatment can help improve the overall well-being and quality of life for children with arthritis.

== Complications ==
Complications of childhood arthritis can vary based on the severity and longevity of the disease. In addition to the continuation of symptoms, other possible complications that stem from childhood arthritis are growth inhibitions, shown in the form of shortening of the joints or demineralization of the bones, and joint damage. In some more rare or serious cases, problems in the eyes, kidneys, heart, or liver may also occur.

Growth inhibition and joint damage are the main concerns regarding long-term childhood arthritis, due to both the disease itself as well as the medications taken in treatment. As the disease causes the body's own cells to attack and damage the cells within the joints, provoking inflammation and pain, these cells can also weaken the integrity and structure of the bones. A common treatment of inflammation for those with any form of arthritis are glucocorticoids. This medication is a class of steroids, which when specially taken over a long period of time, have been shown to reduce growth in patients. Though the mechanism is not fully known, the growth has been observed to be inhibited at a cellular level, showing that not only will it inhibit growth of bone and joint length, but can also inhibit bone density as well. This is especially problematic for those who have childhood arthritis that prolongs throughout their adulthood, as it can result in severe frailty and fragility of the bones.
