= Henry Kawahara =

Japanese artist

Henry Kawahara (Japanese: ヘンリー川原; 1961–2012), real name Yoshifumi Kawahara (Japanese: 川原義文), was a Japanese composer of avant-garde music. His music was an eclectic blend of experimental electronic, exotica and new age music. He referred to his music as "cyber-occult".

== Biography ==
According to the notes for Cybernetic Defiance and Orgasm, Kawahara was born in Fukuoka.

Kawahara was very active in the 1990s, releasing at least 23 albums. However, his work fell into obscurity because they were sold at occult book stores instead of music stores. Some of Kawahara's albums had anonymous front and back covers, such as the Horoscope Sounds and Love Meditation series, with his involvement only noted within the liner notes; according to Cybernetic Defiance and Orgasm 2: Other Sides of Henry Kawahara's liner notes, there may be more of these uncredited Henry Kawahara albums lying undiscovered.

He was closely tied to occult bookstore Hachiman (ja:八幡書店). He also worked with the new age label Green Energy, where he would produce albums for others as well. His albums were produced to accompany the Stargazer, an LED device he helped invent

The occult themes that Kawahara explored do not refer to the occult in western esotericism. According to Hachiman's Sugen Takada, the idea was to look beyond common sense and rationalism. Hachiman's occult writings and rights to experimental Holophonics technology created the "cyber-occult" ideas explored by Kawahara's music.

After 1996, Kawahara lost interest in stereo music. He produced the video game The DJ-Rom for Sony in 1998.

He was diagnosed with adult-onset Still's disease, and moved to Cambodia, where he died in 2012. His music experienced a revival in popularity during the early 2020s, leading to the release of a compilation Kawahara compiled before his death, Cybernetic Defiance and Orgasm.
