= Hyaloserositis =

Coating of an organ with a fibrous hyaline due to serositis

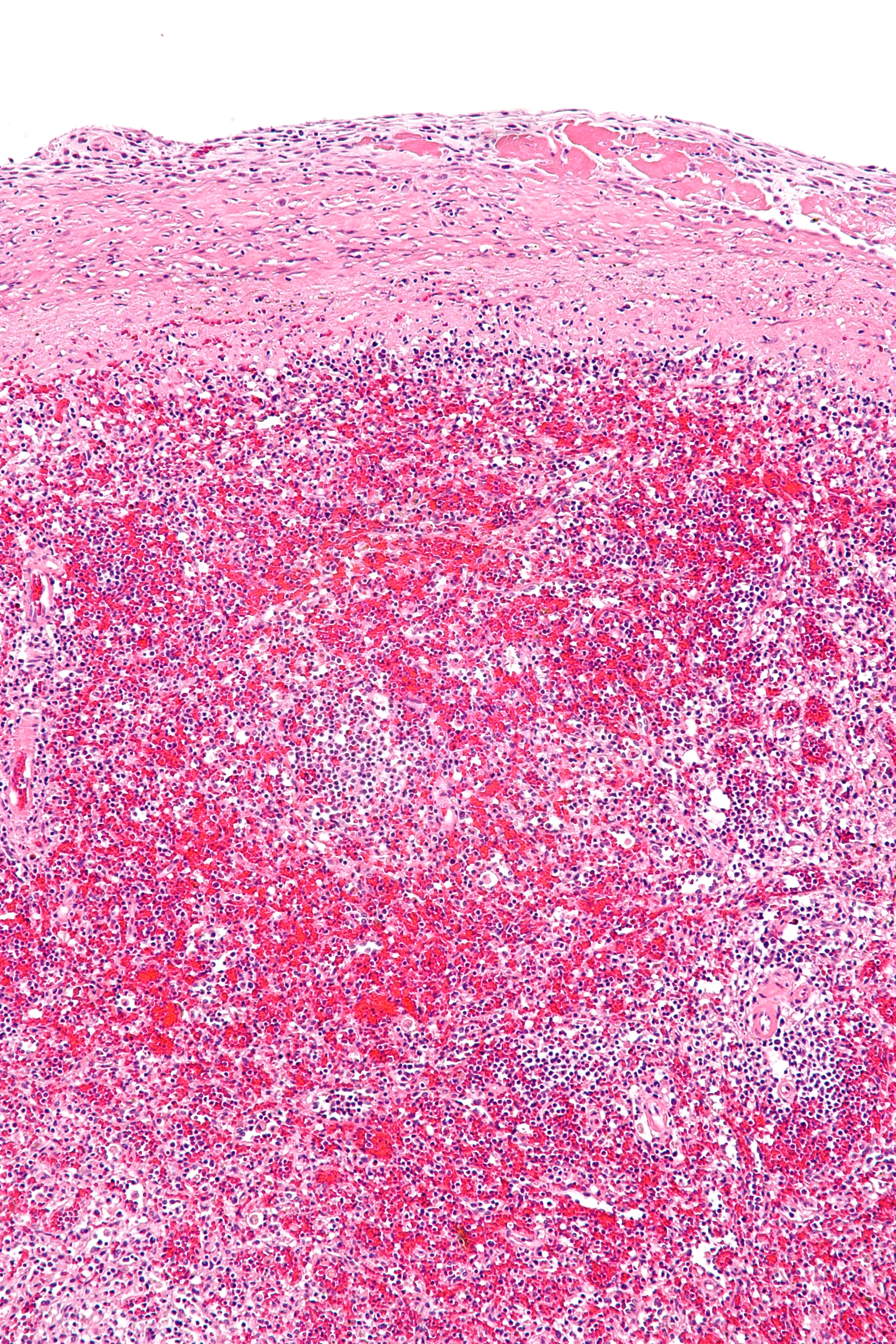
Micrograph of hyaloserositis of the spleen (sugar-coated spleen). H&E stain.

In pathology, hyaloserositis is the coating of an organ with a fibrous hyaline, resulting from inflammation of the serous membrane (serositis) covering the organ.

The spleen is commonly affected and often referred to as sugar-coated spleen. The liver and heart are also sometimes affected and referred to as frosted liver (or sugar-coated liver) and frosted heart respectively.

Hyaloserositis of the spleen is usually considered benign, i.e. it does not necessitate any treatment.

== See also ==
- Hyaline
- Serositis
