= Hyaline =

Biological substance with a glassy appearance

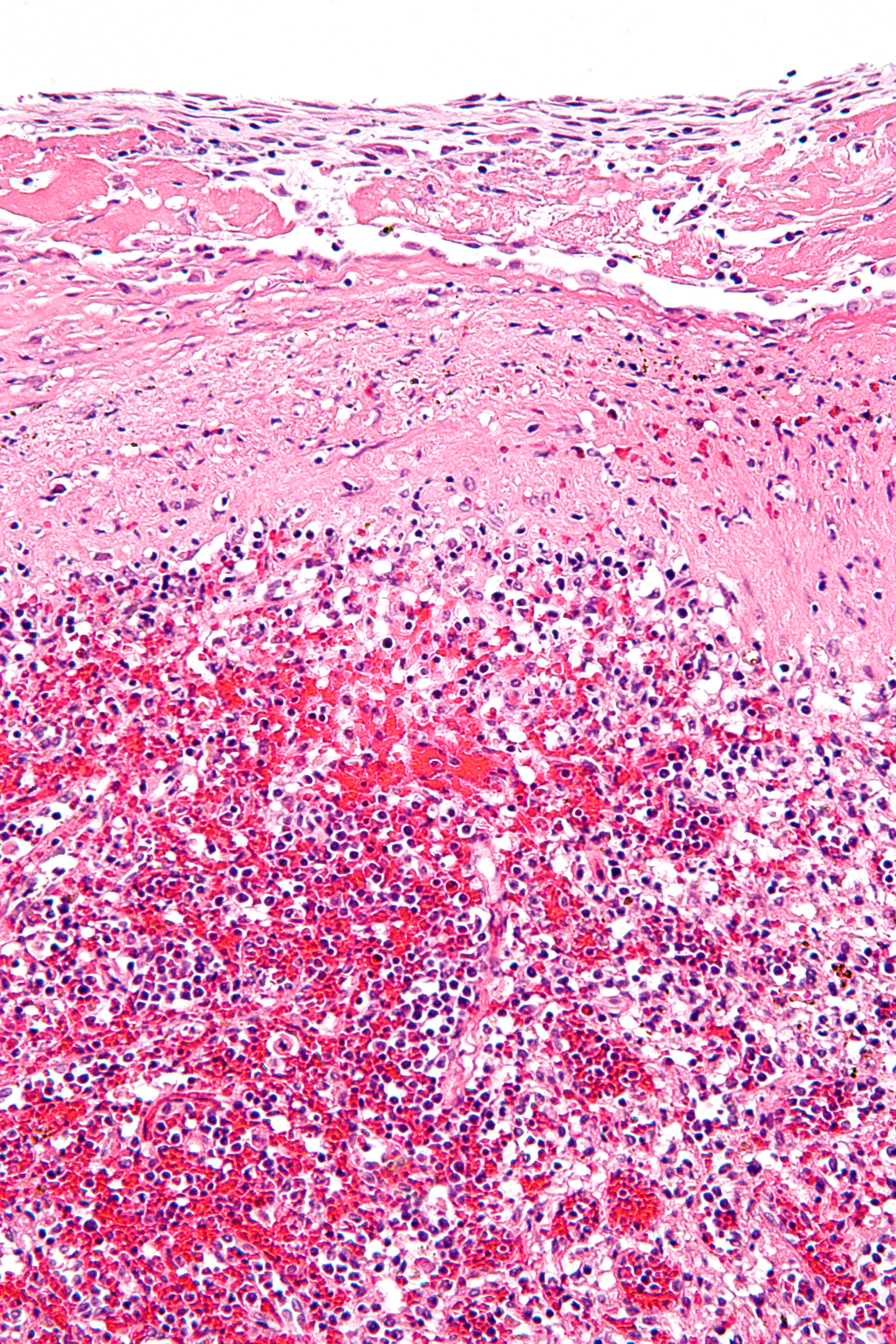
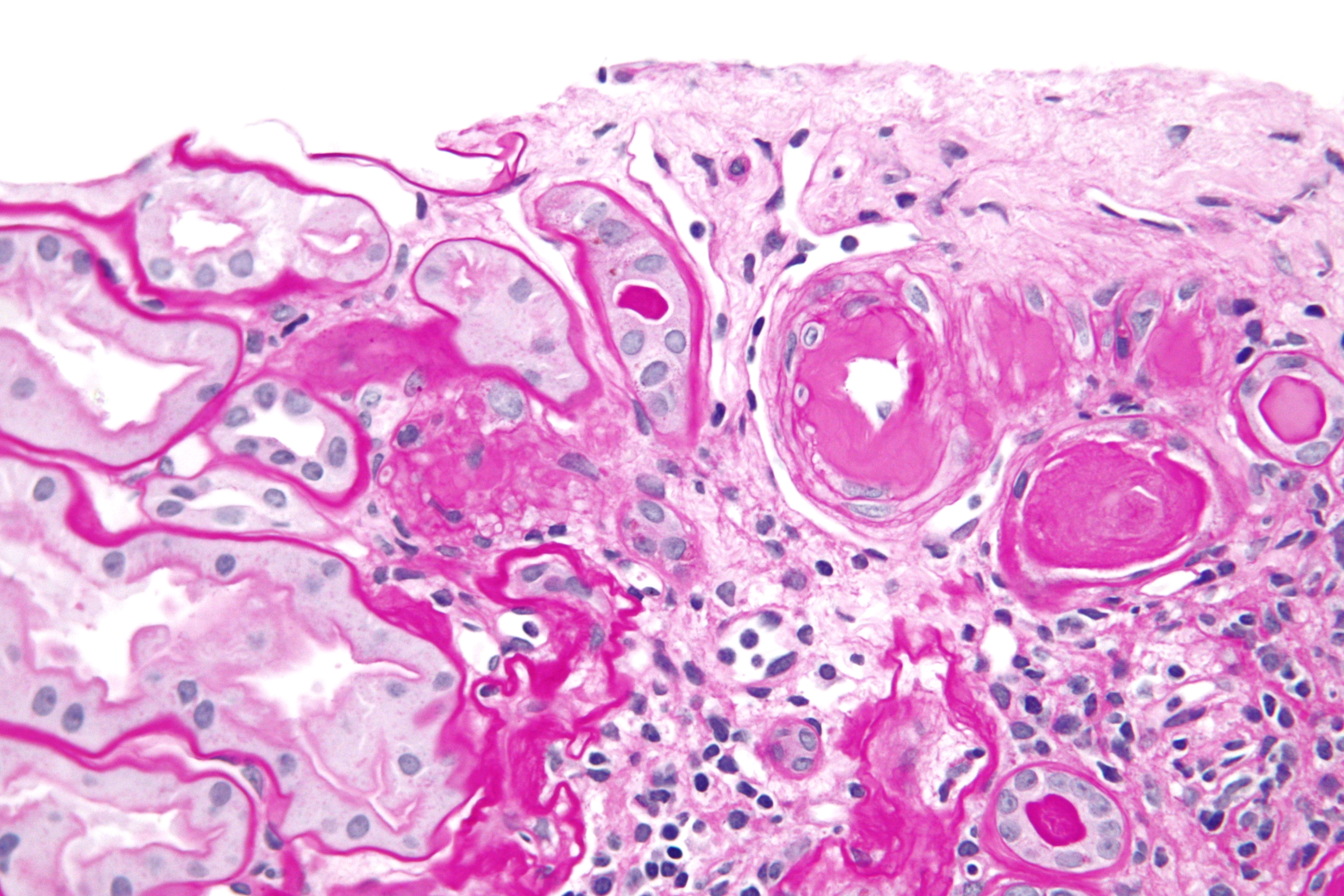
At left is a micrograph of spleen with hyaline deposition (pink material at top of image) in association with inflammation (hyaloserositis), using H&E stain. At right is a micrograph of a kidney with arterial hyaline (hyaline arteriolosclerosis), using PAS stain.

A hyaline substance is one with a glassy appearance. The word is derived from Greek: ὑάλινος, romanized: hyálinos, lit. 'transparent', and ὕαλος, hýalos, 'crystal, glass'.

== Histopathology ==
Hyaline cartilage is named after its glassy appearance on fresh gross pathology. On light microscopy of H&E stained slides, the extracellular matrix of hyaline cartilage looks homogeneously pink, and the term "hyaline" is used to describe similarly homogeneously pink material besides the cartilage. Hyaline material is usually acellular and proteinaceous. For example, arterial hyaline is seen in aging, high blood pressure, diabetes mellitus and in association with some drugs (e.g. calcineurin inhibitors). It is bright pink with PAS staining.

== Ichthyology and entomology ==
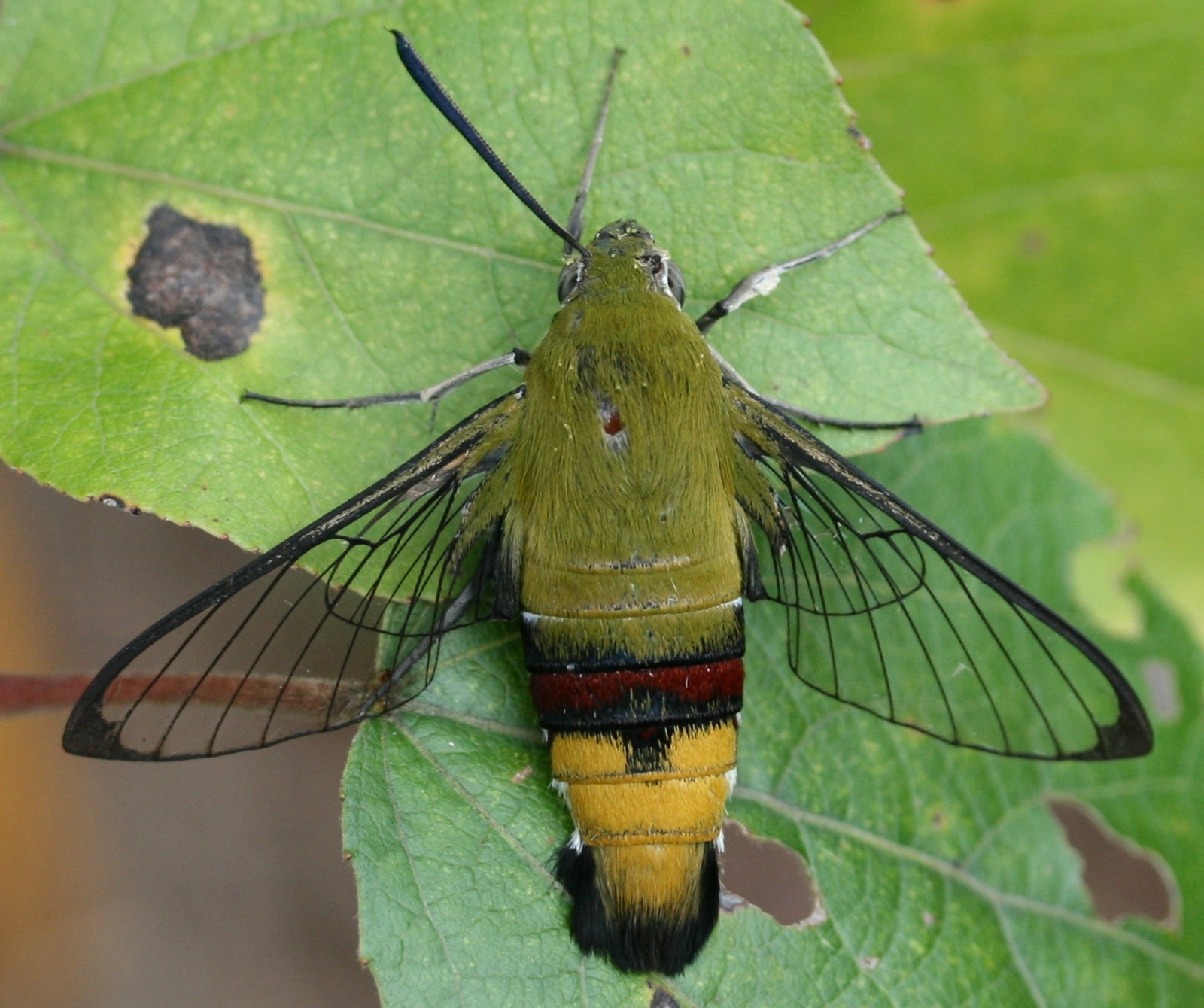
Cephonodes hylas moth

In ichthyology and entomology, hyaline denotes a colorless, transparent substance, such as unpigmented fins of fishes or clear insect wings.

== Botany ==
In botany, hyaline refers to thin and translucent plant parts, such as the margins of some sepals, bracts and leaves.

== See also ==
- Hyaline arteriolosclerosis
- Hyaloid canal, which passes through the eye
- Hyalopilitic
- Hyaloserositis
- Infant respiratory distress syndrome, previously known as hyaline membrane disease
