= UNC13D =

Protein-coding gene in humans

Identifiers
- Aliases: UNC13D, FHL3, HLH3, HPLH3, Munc13-4, unc-13 homolog D
- External IDs: OMIM: 608897; MGI: 1917700; GeneCards: UNC13D

Gene location (Human)
Chr.	Chromosome 17 (human)
Band	17q25.1	Start	75,827,225 bp
Band	17q25.1	End	75,844,552 bp

Gene location (Mouse)
Chr.	Chromosome 11 (mouse)
Band	11|11 E2	Start	115,952,921 bp
Band	11|11 E2	End	115,968,787 bp
RNA expression pattern
Bgee	Human / Mouse (ortholog); Top expressed in: granulocyte; bone marrow cell; spleen; right lung; upper lobe of left lung; monocyte; sural nerve; blood; appendix; lymph node / Top expressed in: granulocyte; embryo; morula; blood; blastocyst; thymus; embryo; epiblast; mesenteric lymph nodes; spleen; More reference expression data
BioGPS	n/a
Gene ontology
Molecular function	protein binding
Cellular component	cytoplasm; Weibel-Palade body; recycling endosome; endosome; late endosome; lysosome; exocytic vesicle; membrane; extracellular region; cytosol; azurophil granule lumen; endoplasmic reticulum; intracellular membrane-bounded organelle
Biological process	natural killer cell degranulation; regulation of mast cell degranulation; germinal center formation; positive regulation of exocytosis; positive regulation of substrate adhesion-dependent cell spreading; defense response to virus; granuloma formation; positive regulation of regulated secretory pathway; phagocytosis; exocytosis; neutrophil degranulation
Sources:Amigo / QuickGO
Orthologs
Databases	NCBI: entry; OMA: entry
Species	Human	Mouse
Entrez	201294	70450
Ensembl	ENSG00000092929	ENSMUSG00000057948
UniProt	Q70J99	B2RUP2
RefSeq (mRNA)	NM_199242	NM_001009573
RefSeq (protein)	NP_954712	NP_001009573
Location (UCSC)	Chr 17: 75.83 – 75.84 Mb	Chr 11: 115.95 – 115.97 Mb
PubMed search
- Wikidata
View/Edit Human	View/Edit Mouse

Protein unc-13 homolog D, also known as munc13-4, is a protein that in humans is encoded by the UNC13D gene.

== Function ==
Munc13-4 is a member of the UNC13 family, containing similar domain structure as other family members but lacking an N-terminal phorbol ester-binding C1 domain present in other Munc13 proteins. The protein appears to play a role in vesicle maturation during exocytosis and is involved in regulation of cytolytic granules secretion.

== Clinical significance ==
Mutations in the UNC13D gene are associated with hemophagocytic lymphohistiocytosis type 3.
