= Juvenile dermatomyositis =

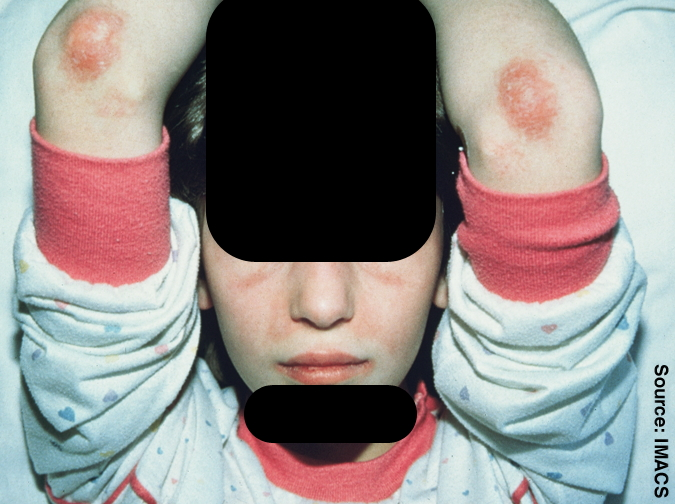
- Juvenile dermatomyositis
- Specialty: Rheumatology

Juvenile dermatomyositis (JDM) is an idiopathic inflammatory myopathy (IMM) of presumed autoimmune dysfunction resulting in muscle weakness among other complications. It manifests itself in children; it is the pediatric counterpart of dermatomyositis. In JDM, the body's immune system attacks blood vessels throughout the body, causing inflammation called vasculitis. In the United States, the incidence rate of JDMS is approximately 2-3 cases per million children per year. The UK incidence is believed to be between 2-3 per million children per year, with some difference between ethnic groups. The sex ratio (Female : Male) is approximately 2:1. Other Idiopathic inflammatory myopathies include; juvenile polymyositis (PM), which is rare and not as common in children as in adults.

== Signs and symptoms ==
The vasculitis caused by JDMS manifests itself predominantly in two ways:

One is a distinctive rash. The rash often affects the face, eyelids, and hands, and sometimes the skin above joints, including the knuckles, knees, elbows, etc. The color of the rash is a pinkish purple, and is called heliotrope (after a flower of the same name with approximately this color). On the hands and face, the rash very closely resembles allergies, eczema, fifth disease, or other more common skin condition, but the heliotrope color is unique to the inflammatory process of JDMS. Some children develop calcinosis, which are calcium deposits under the skin. The rash is the source of the "dermato-" part of the name of the disease.

The second symptom caused by vasculitis is muscle inflammation. This symptom is the source of the "-myositis" part of the name of the disease ("myo" = muscle, "-itis" = inflammation of). Muscle Inflammation causes muscle weakness, which can cause fatigue, clumsiness, not keeping up physically with peers, and eventually inability to perform tasks like climbing stairs, lifting objects, and performing other manual tasks. Other signs may include falling, dysphonia, or dysphagia. The muscle weakness often causes a medical misdiagnosis of muscular dystrophy or other muscle disease. Some patients develop contractures, when the muscle shortens and causes joints to stay bent; exercise, occupational therapy, and physical therapy can prevent this. The muscles first affected tend to be proximal (i.e., neck, shoulders, back, and abdominal). About half of children with JDMS also have pain in their muscles.

Other symptoms may include irritability, weight loss, and mouth ulcers. When a child becomes irritable, fatigued, reluctant to socialize, and the face becomes flushed easily, physicians refer to this constellation of symptoms as "misery."

=== Progression ===
The speed of the progression of JDMS is highly variable. Nearly all JDM patients have some skin involvement. The JDMS rash usually occurs as the initial symptom. Sometimes it is so slight as not to be recognized for what it is until muscle symptoms appear. Sometimes muscle symptoms never appear at all or occur very gradually over the course of months, and sometimes going from normal strength to being unable to walk within days. Usually, muscle symptoms appear weeks to months after the onset of the rash.

== Cause ==
The underlying cause of JDM is unknown. It most likely has a genetic component, as other autoimmune disease tend to run in the families of patients. The disease is usually triggered by a condition that causes immune system activity that does not stop as it should, but the trigger is almost certainly not the cause in most cases. Common triggers include immunizations, infections, injuries, and sunburn.

== Diagnosis ==
Proximal muscle weakness, characteristic skin rash and elevated muscle enzymes are routinely used to identify JDM. Typical magnetic resonance imaging and muscle biopsy changes are considered the next most useful diagnostic criteria, followed by myopathic changes on electromyogram, calcinosis, dysphonia and nailfold capillaroscopy. Other useful criteria include myositis-specific or -related antibodies, nailfold capillaroscopy, factor VIII-related antigen, muscle ultrasound, calcinosis and neopterin.

== Treatment ==
Once a diagnosis of JDMS is made, the treatment is often a 3-day course of Intravenous ("pulse") steroids (methylprednisolone, Solu-Medrol), followed by a high dose of oral prednisone (usually 1–2 mg/kg of body weight) for several weeks. This action usually brings the disease under control, lowering most lab tests to or near normal values. Some minor improvement in muscle symptoms may also be seen in this time, but normally it takes a long time for full muscle strength to be regained.

Once the disease process is under control, oral steroids are tapered gradually to minimize their side effects. Often, steroid-sparing drugs, such as methotrexate (a chemotherapy drug) or other DMARDs, are given to compensate for the reduction in oral steroids. Once the oral steroids are reduced to a less toxic level, the sparing agents can also be gradually withdrawn. Lab results are closely monitored during the tapering process to ensure that the disease does not recur.

In the cases where steroids or second-line drugs are not tolerated or are ineffective, there are other treatments that can be tried. These include other chemotherapy drugs, such as ciclosporin, infliximab, or other DMARDs. Another is intravenous immunoglobulin (IVIg), a blood product that has been shown to be very effective against JDMS.

To treat the skin rash, anti-malarial drugs, such as hydroxychloroquine (Plaquenil) are usually given. Topical steroid creams (hydrocortisone) may help some patients, and anti-inflammatory creams (such as tacrolimus) are proving to be very effective. Dry skin caused by the rash can be combatted by regular application of sunscreen or any moisturizing cream. Most JDM patients are very sensitive to sun exposure, and sunburn may be a disease activity trigger in some, so daily application of high-SPF sunscreen is often recommended.

== Prognosis ==
Of the children diagnosed with and treated for JDM, about half will recover completely. Close to 30 percent will have weakness after the disease resolves. Most children will go into remission and have their medications eliminated within two years, while others may take longer to respond or have more severe symptoms that take longer to clear up.

A common lasting effect of JDM is childhood arthritis.

== Gallery ==
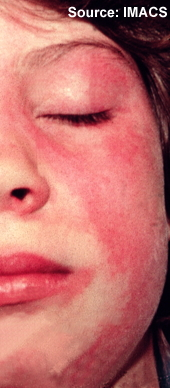
