= HPLH1 =

Protein associated with hemophagocytic lymphohistiocytosis type 1

hemophagocytic lymphohistiocytosis 1

Identifiers
- Symbol: HPLH1
- NCBI gene: 27259
- HGNC: 23824
- OMIM: 267700

Other data
- Locus: Chr. 9 q21.3-q22

HPLH1 is a protein associated with hemophagocytic lymphohistiocytosis type 1.
