= Hemophagocytosis =

Phagocytosis of blood cells

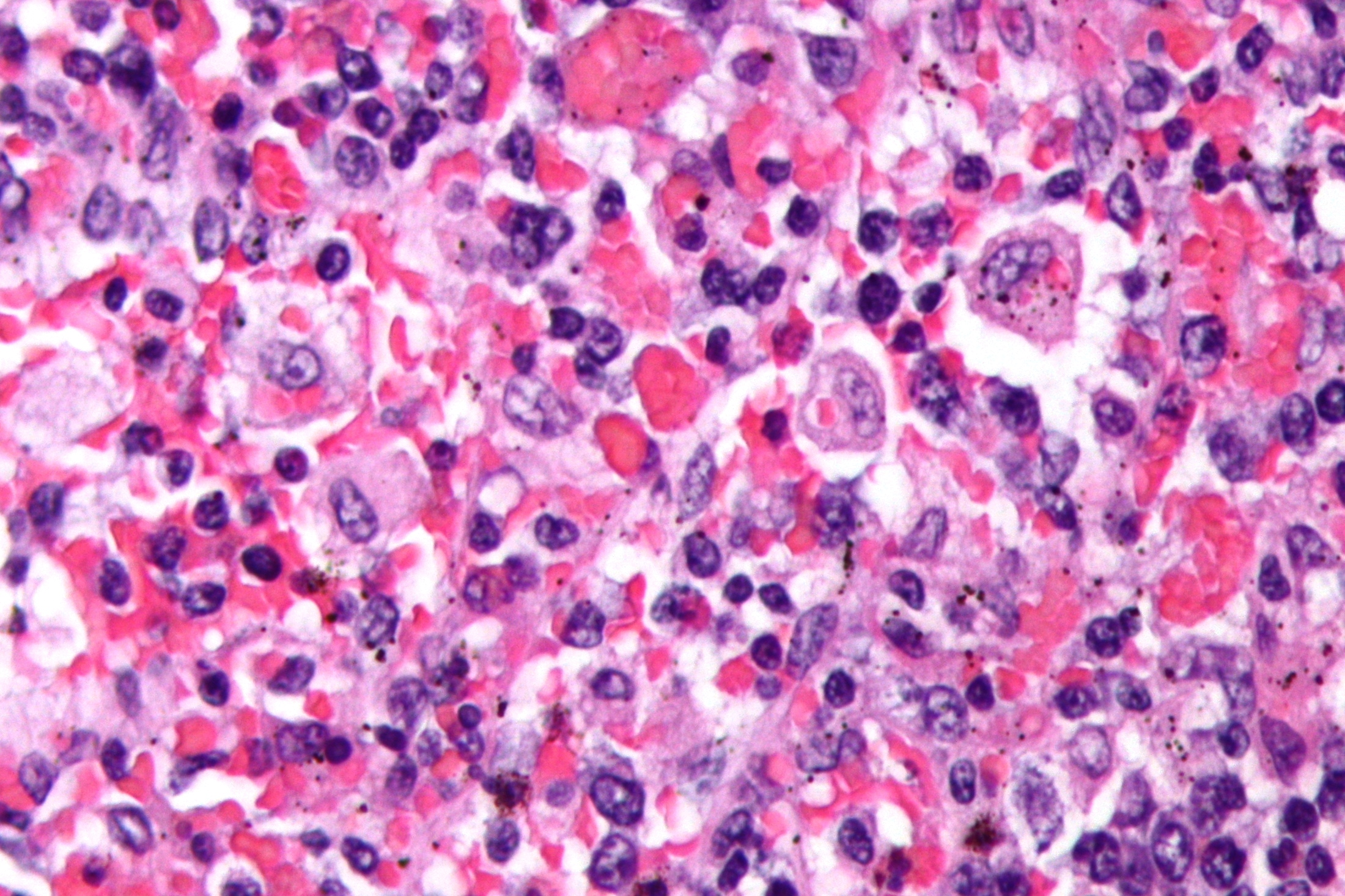
Micrograph showing hemophagocytosis in the spleen. H&E stain.

Hemophagocytosis is a dangerous form of phagocytosis in which histiocytes engulf red blood cells, white blood cells, platelets, and their precursors in bone marrow and other tissues.

It is part of the presentation of hemophagocytic lymphohistiocytosis and macrophage activation syndrome. It has also been seen at autopsy of people who died of COVID-19.
