= RBCK1 =

Protein-coding gene in the species Homo sapiens

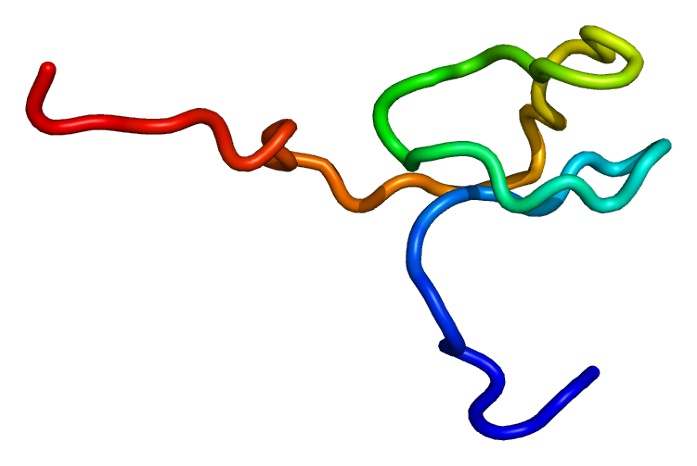

Identifiers
- Aliases: RBCK1, C20orf18, HOIL-1, HOIL1, PBMEI, RBCK2, RNF54, UBCE7IP3, XAP3, XAP4, ZRANB4, PGBM1, RANBP2-type and C3HC4-type zinc finger containing 1
- External IDs: OMIM: 610924; MGI: 1344372; GeneCards: RBCK1
Available structures
PDB	Ortholog search: PDBe RCSB
PDB	List of PDB id codes 2CRC, 2LGY, 4DBG
Enzyme activity
EC #	BRENDA	ExPASy	KEGG	MetaCyc
2.3.2.31	↗	↗	↗	↗

Gene location (Human)
Chr.	Chromosome 20 (human)
Band	20p13	Start	407,498 bp
Band	20p13	End	432,139 bp

Gene location (Mouse)
Chr.	Chromosome 2 (mouse)
Band	2|2 G3	Start	152,158,254 bp
Band	2|2 G3	End	152,174,573 bp
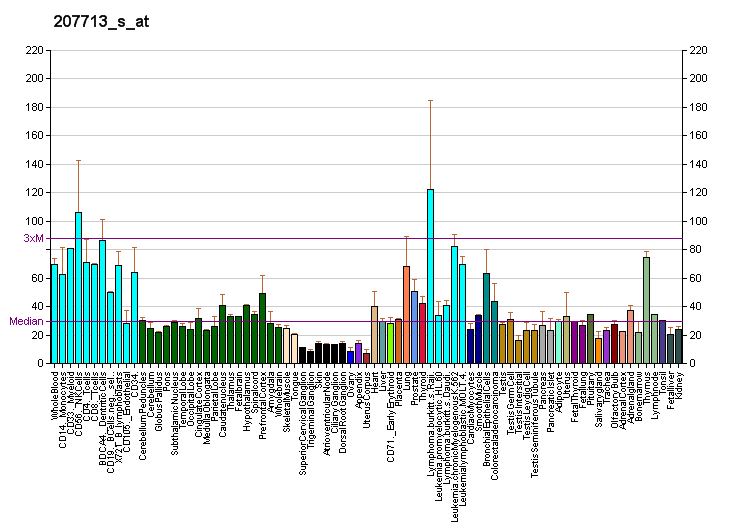
RNA expression pattern
Bgee	Human / Mouse (ortholog); Top expressed in: right hemisphere of cerebellum; anterior pituitary; right uterine tube; right lobe of liver; granulocyte; right adrenal gland; left adrenal cortex; right adrenal cortex; right lobe of thyroid gland; mucosa of transverse colon / Top expressed in: neural layer of retina; superior frontal gyrus; ankle joint; thymus; lip; dentate gyrus of hippocampal formation granule cell; primary visual cortex; granulocyte; mesenteric lymph nodes; genital tubercle; More reference expression data
BioGPS	More reference expression data
Gene ontology
Molecular function	DNA-binding transcription factor activity; metal ion binding; ubiquitin binding; protein binding; ubiquitin-protein transferase activity; transferase activity; identical protein binding
Cellular component	cytosol; LUBAC complex
Biological process	negative regulation of necroptotic process; regulation of tumor necrosis factor-mediated signaling pathway; positive regulation of NF-kappaB transcription factor activity; positive regulation of apoptotic process; positive regulation of I-kappaB kinase/NF-kappaB signaling; positive regulation of extrinsic apoptotic signaling pathway; viral process; I-kappaB kinase/NF-kappaB signaling; negative regulation of NF-kappaB transcription factor activity; T cell receptor signaling pathway; protein linear polyubiquitination; proteasome-mediated ubiquitin-dependent protein catabolic process; protein polyubiquitination; positive regulation of NIK/NF-kappaB signaling; regulation of transcription, DNA-templated
Sources:Amigo / QuickGO
Orthologs
Databases	NCBI: entry; OMA: entry
Species	Human	Mouse
Entrez	10616	24105
Ensembl	ENSG00000125826	ENSMUSG00000027466
UniProt	Q9BYM8	Q9WUB0
RefSeq (mRNA)	NM_006462; NM_031227; NM_031228; NM_031229; NM_001323956 NM_001323958; NM_001323960	NM_001083921; NM_019705; NM_001355282
RefSeq (protein)	NP_001310885; NP_001310887; NP_001310889; NP_006453; NP_112506	NP_001077390; NP_062679; NP_001342211
Location (UCSC)	Chr 20: 0.41 – 0.43 Mb	Chr 2: 152.16 – 152.17 Mb
PubMed search
- Wikidata
View/Edit Human	View/Edit Mouse

RanBP-type and C3HC4-type zinc finger-containing protein 1 (also known as HOIL-1) is a protein that in humans is encoded by the RBCK1 gene.

The protein encoded by this gene is similar to mouse UIP28/UbcM4 interacting protein. Alternative splicing has been observed at this locus, resulting in distinct isoforms.

HOIL-1 is an E3 ubiquitin ligase and a part of the linear ubiquitin chain assembly complex (LUBAC), the only known ubiquitin ligase generating linear (Met1) polyubiquitin linkages. Although HOIL-1 isn’t responsible for the linear ubiquitin generation, it is a necessary component of LUBAC and ensures its proper assembly and function. Unlike most E3 ubiquitin ligases, HOIL-1 is able to catalyze oxyester bond formation between the C-terminus of a ubiquitin monomer and Ser/Thr of a different protein. This recently discovered function of HOIL-1 has so far been described in the context of MyD88 signaling. Additionally, a catalytically inactive mutant of HOIL-1 (HOIL-1^{C458S}) led to prolonged IKK activation and increase of inflammatory cytokine production by cytotoxic T cells. The proposed mechanism is that the ester-linked ubiquitin chains limit the size of isopeptide-linked (K63 and/or M1) ubiquitin chains.

== Clinical significance ==
A family quartet was found with two children, both affected with a previously unreported disease, characterized by progressive muscular weakness and cardiomyopathy, with normal intelligence. During the course of the study, one additional unrelated patient was found with a comparable phenotype. From whole-genome sequence data, RBCK1, a gene encoding an E3 ubiquitin-protein ligase, was identified as the most likely candidate gene, with two protein-truncating mutations in probands in the first family. Sanger sequencing identified a private homozygous splice variant in RBCK1 in the proband in the second family, yet single-nucleotide polymorphism (SNP) genotyping revealed a 1.2Mb copy-neutral region of homozygosity covering RBCK1. RNA-Seq confirmed aberrant splicing of RBCK1 transcripts, resulting in truncated protein products. Ten other individuals with mutations in RBCK1 and overlapping phenotypes have been identified.
