= Neutrophilic dermatosis of the dorsal hands =

- Other names: Pustular vasculitis of the dorsal hands
- Specialty: Dermatology

Neutrophilic dermatosis of the dorsal hands (NDDH) is a skin condition that presents with edematous pustular or ulcerative nodules or plaques localized to the dorsal hands.

== Signs and symptoms ==
Neutrophilic dermatosis of the dorsal hands is characterized by bullae, pustules, and delicate erythematous plaques on the hands' dorsa.

== Causes ==
Neutrophilic dermatosis of the dorsal hands is often associated with other conditions. Hematological disorders such as myelodysplastic syndrome and plasma cell dyscrasias are common.

== Diagnosis ==
The histopathology of NDDH lesions shows a dense neutrophil infiltrate in the dermis, which is typically linked to leukocytoclastic debris and subepidermal edema.

== Treatment ==
Systemic corticosteroids are the main method of treatment.

== See also ==
- List of cutaneous conditions
