= Syntaxin binding protein 2 =

Protein-coding gene in the species Homo sapiens

STXBP2
Available structures
PDB	Ortholog search: PDBe RCSB
PDB	List of PDB id codes 4CCA

Identifiers
- Aliases: STXBP2, FHL5, Hunc18b, MUNC18-2, UNC18-2, UNC18B, pp10122, Syntaxin binding protein 2
- External IDs: OMIM: 601717; MGI: 107370; HomoloGene: 55530; GeneCards: STXBP2; OMA:STXBP2 - orthologs

Gene location (Human)
Chr.	Chromosome 19 (human)
Band	19p13.2	Start	7,636,881 bp
Band	19p13.2	End	7,647,873 bp

Gene location (Mouse)
Chr.	Chromosome 8 (mouse)
Band	8 A1.1|8 1.92 cM	Start	3,680,955 bp
Band	8 A1.1|8 1.92 cM	End	3,693,644 bp
RNA expression pattern
Bgee	Human / Mouse (ortholog); Top expressed in: granulocyte; monocyte; mucosa of transverse colon; body of pancreas; upper lobe of left lung; right lung; right uterine tube; left testis; right lobe of thyroid gland; right testis / Top expressed in: granulocyte; neural layer of retina; yolk sac; superior frontal gyrus; lip; right kidney; submandibular gland; saccule; duodenum; stomach; More reference expression data
BioGPS	n/a
Gene ontology
Molecular function	protein binding; syntaxin-1 binding; syntaxin-3 binding
Cellular component	cytolytic granule; tertiary granule; SNARE complex; azurophil granule; specific granule; apical plasma membrane; extracellular exosome; plasma membrane; zymogen granule membrane; extracellular region; cytosol; phagocytic vesicle
Biological process	protein transport; neutrophil degranulation; vesicle docking involved in exocytosis; regulation of mast cell degranulation; leukocyte mediated cytotoxicity; vesicle-mediated transport; exocytosis; platelet degranulation; transport; cellular response to interferon-gamma
Sources:Amigo / QuickGO
Orthologs
Species	Human	Mouse
Entrez	6813	20911
Ensembl	ENSG00000076944	ENSMUSG00000004626
UniProt	Q15833	Q64324
RefSeq (mRNA)	NM_001127396; NM_001272034; NM_006949	NM_011503; NM_001357168
RefSeq (protein)	NP_001120868; NP_001258963; NP_008880	NP_035633; NP_001344097
Location (UCSC)	Chr 19: 7.64 – 7.65 Mb	Chr 8: 3.68 – 3.69 Mb
PubMed search
- Wikidata
View/Edit Human	View/Edit Mouse

Syntaxin-binding protein 2 is a protein that in humans is encoded by the STXBP2 gene.
