= Serositis =

Inflammation of the serous tissues of the body

- Specialty: Rheumatology

Serositis refers to inflammation of the serous tissues of the body, the tissues lining the lungs (pleura), heart (pericardium), and the inner lining of the abdomen (peritoneum) and organs within. It is commonly found with fat wrapping or creeping fat.

== Causes ==
Serositis is seen in numerous conditions:

- Lupus erythematosus (SLE), for which it is one of the criteria,
- Rheumatoid arthritis
- Familial Mediterranean fever (FMF)
- Chronic kidney failure / Uremia
- Juvenile idiopathic arthritis
- Inflammatory bowel disease (especially Crohn's disease)
- Acute appendicitis
- Diffuse cutaneous systemic sclerosis

== See also ==
- Hyaloserositis
