= LUBAC =

Linear ubiquitin chain assembly complex (LUBAC) is a multi-protein complex and the only known E3 ubiquitin ligase able to conjugate ubiquitin in a head-to-tail manner to generate linear (M1-linked) polyubiquitin chains. The complex is currently known to be composed of three proteins: heme-oxidized IRP2 ubiquitin ligase 1 (HOIL-1), HOIL-1-interacting protein (HOIP), and Shank-associated RH domain-interacting protein (SHARPIN). HOIL-1 and HOIP are both E3 ubiquitin ligases, however, the specific linear ubiquitin-ligating activity is enacted by HOIP. Mice deficient in HOIP are embryonically lethal. Two cases of mutated HOIP have been detected in humans. These patients presented with autoinflammation and immunodeficiency. HOIL-1 is required for LUBAC assembly and stability as demonstrated by embryonic lethality in HOIL-1 deficient mice. Recently, it has been noted, that HOIL-1 is also able to catalyze formation of oxyester bonds between the C-terminus of ubiquitin and serine/threonine of substrate protein in TLR signaling. SHARPIN exhibits a significant sequence similarity to HOIL-1 and is important for LUBAC stability. Spontaneous point mutation in the Sharpin gene in mice leads to development of chronic proliferative dermatitis (cpdm). Both HOIL-1 and SHARPIN bind to HOIP through their ubiquitin-like (UBL) domain. LUBAC consisting of either HOIP-HOIL-1 or HOIP-SHARPIN is functional in vitro, however the greatest activity of the complex has been observed in the presence of all three components.

LUBAC modulates signaling complexes activating the canonical NF-kB pathway in response to various stimuli (e.g., TNF, IL-1, CD40L) by adding M1-linked polyubiquitin chains to signaling proteins. Additionally, LUBAC has been shown to interact with PKC and NLRP3/ASC inflammasome.

Antagonistic to LUBAC are deubiquitinases such as OTULIN or CYLD, of which OTULIN is the only deubiquitinase that removes M1-linked ubiquitin linkages exclusively.

LUBAC components have been most widely studied in the context of TNF signaling.
