= Adult-onset Still's disease =

- Specialty: Rheumatology
- Frequency: 0.005%
- Named after: Sir George Frederic Still

Adult-onset Still's disease (AOSD) is a form of Still's disease, a rare systemic autoinflammatory disease characterized by the classic triad of fevers, joint pain, and a distinctive salmon-colored bumpy rash. The disease is considered a diagnosis of exclusion. Levels of the iron-binding protein ferritin may be extremely elevated with this disorder. AOSD may present in a similar manner to other inflammatory diseases and two autoimmune diseases, which must be ruled out before making the diagnosis.

Prognosis is usually favorable but manifestations of the disease affecting the lungs, heart, or kidneys may occasionally cause severe life-threatening complications. It is treated first with corticosteroids such as prednisone. Medications that block the action of interleukin-1, such as anakinra, can be effective treatments when standard steroid treatments are insufficient.

Obvious similarities exist with juvenile rheumatoid arthritis (also known as "juvenile-onset Still's disease"), and there is some evidence that the two conditions are closely related.

== Signs and symptoms ==
The disease typically presents with joint pain, high fevers, a salmon-pink macular or maculopapular rash, enlargement of the liver and spleen, swollen lymph nodes, and a neutrophil-predominant increased white blood cell count in the blood. Tests for rheumatoid factor and anti-nuclear antibodies are usually negative and serum ferritin is markedly elevated. Patients experiencing a flare-up from adult-onset Still's disease usually report extreme fatigue, swelling of the lymph nodes and, less commonly, fluid accumulation in the lungs and heart. In rare cases, AOSD can cause life-threatening complications, including hemophagocytic lymphohistiocytosis, intervertebral disc calcification (IVDC), fulminant hepatitis, or disabling conditions such as aseptic meningitis and sensorineural hearing loss. Although more frequently described as associated with rheumatoid arthritis, Still's disease can lead to hematological complications such as thrombotic microangiopathy.

== Pathophysiology ==
The cause of adult-onset Still's disease is unknown and it is not heritable, but it presumably involves interleukin-1 (IL-1), since medications that block the action of IL-1β are effective treatments. Interleukin-18 is expressed at high levels.

== Diagnosis ==
The diagnosis is clinical, not based upon serology. At least seven sets of diagnostic criteria have been devised; however, the Yamaguchi criteria have the highest sensitivity. Diagnosis requires at least five features, with at least two of these being major diagnostic criteria.

Major criteria	Minor criteria
Fever of at least 39 °C for at least one week	Sore throat
Joint pains or arthritis for at least two weeks	Swollen lymph nodes
Non-itchy salmon-colored rash (usually over trunk or extremities while febrile)	Enlargement of the liver or spleen
Leukocytosis (10,000/microL or greater), with granulocyte predominance	Abnormal liver function tests
	Negative tests for antinuclear antibody and rheumatoid factor

=== Classification ===
People with AOSD generally experience one of two patterns in the disease:

- a debilitating pattern of fevers, joint pain, and other systemic symptoms, or
- a somewhat less aggressive pattern, in which the main symptom is chronic joint pain and arthritis.

One set of 21 adult-onset Still's disease patients were divided into four types, according to clinical course patterns. These included monocyclic systemic disease, polycyclic systemic disease, chronic articular monocyclic systemic disease, and chronic articular polycyclic systemic disease. People with chronic articular and polyarticular disease were at higher risk to develop disabling arthritis.

== Treatment ==
Adult-onset Still's disease is treated with anti-inflammatory medications. Steroids such as prednisone are used to treat severe symptoms of Still's. Other infrequently used medications include hydroxychloroquine, penicillamine, azathioprine, methotrexate, etanercept, cyclophosphamide, adalimumab, rituximab, and infliximab.

Newer medications target interleukin-1 (IL-1), particularly IL-1β. A randomized, multicenter trial reported better outcomes in a group of 12 patients treated with anakinra than in a group of 10 patients taking other disease-modifying antirheumatic drugs. In June 2020 FDA approved Ilaris (canakinumab) for the treatment of AOSD, this is the first FDA approved treatment for AOSD. Canakinumab is another anti-IL1 drug which selectively binds IL-1β and rilonacept which blocks both IL-1A and IL-1β. The monoclonal anti-IL6 antibody tocilizumab is another treatment option as effective as anakinra.

The condition "juvenile-onset Still's disease" is now usually grouped under juvenile rheumatoid arthritis. However, there are obvious similarities between the two conditions, and there is some evidence that they may be closely related.

== Epidemiology ==
Adult-onset Still's disease is rare and has been described all over the world. The number of new cases per year is estimated to be 1.6 per 1,000,000 population. The number of people currently affected is estimated at 1.5 cases per 100,000–1,000,000 population. Onset is most common in two age ranges, between ages 16–25 and between ages of 36–46 years.

== History ==
Still's disease is named after English physician Sir George Frederic Still (1868–1941). The adult-onset version was characterized by E. G. Bywaters in 1971.

== Research directions ==
Researchers are investigating whether levels of a protein named calprotectin could be used to improve diagnosis and monitoring.

== See also ==
- Juvenile idiopathic arthritis
- The Big Sick
