= Macrophage activation syndrome =

- Other names: MAS
- Specialty: Rheumatology

Macrophage activation syndrome is a severe, potentially life-threatening, complication of several chronic rheumatic diseases of childhood. It occurs most commonly with systemic-onset juvenile idiopathic arthritis (SoJIA). In addition, MAS has been described in association with systemic lupus erythematosus (SLE), Kawasaki disease, and adult-onset Still's disease. It is thought to be closely related and pathophysiologically very similar to reactive (secondary) hemophagocytic lymphohistiocytosis (HLH). The incidence of MAS is unknown as there is a wide spectrum of clinical manifestations, and episodes may remain unrecognized.

== Signs and symptoms ==
The hallmark clinical and laboratory features include high fever, hepatosplenomegaly, lymphadenopathy, pancytopenia, liver dysfunction, disseminated intravascular coagulation, hypofibrinogenemia, hyperferritinemia, and hypertriglyceridemia. Despite marked systemic inflammation, the erythrocyte sedimentation rate (ESR) is paradoxically depressed, caused by low fibrinogen levels. The low ESR helps to distinguish the disorder from a flare of the underlying rheumatic disorder, in which case the ESR is usually elevated. A bone marrow biopsy or aspirate usually shows hemophagocytosis.

== Cause ==
In many cases a trigger is identified, often a viral infection, or a medication. There is uncontrolled activation and proliferation of macrophages, and T lymphocytes, with a marked increase in circulating cytokines, such as IFN-gamma, and GM-CSF. The underlying causative event is unclear, and is the subject of ongoing research. In many cases of MAS, a decreased natural killer cell (NK-cell) function is found.

== Diagnosis ==
A febrile patient with known or suspected SoJIA must be considered for macrophage activation if:

- Ferritin >684 ng/ml

and any 2 of the following:

- Hemoglobin <90g/L (in infants <4 weeks: <100g/L)
- Platelets <100 x 109/L
- Neutrophils <1.0 x 109/L
- Fasting triglycerides ≥3.0 mmol/L (i.e., ≥ 265 mg/dl)
- Fibrinogen ≤1.5 g/L

In addition, other specific markers of macrophage activation (e.g. soluble CD163), and lymphocyte activation (e.g. soluble IL-2 receptor) can be helpful. NK cell function analysis may show depressed NK function, or, flow cytometry may show a depressed NK cell population.

== Treatment ==
The best treatment for MAS has not been firmly established. Most commonly used treatments include high-dose glucocorticoids, and cyclosporine. In refractory cases treatment regimens are used similar to that in HLH.

Anakinra is also effective.

== See also ==
- Cytokine release syndrome
