= Hepatosplenomegaly =

Enlargement of the liver and spleen

- Specialty: Gastroenterology

Hepatosplenomegaly (commonly abbreviated HSM) is the simultaneous enlargement of both the liver (hepatomegaly) and the spleen (splenomegaly). Hepatosplenomegaly can occur as the result of acute viral hepatitis, infectious mononucleosis, and histoplasmosis or it can be the sign of a serious and life-threatening lysosomal storage disease. Systemic venous hypertension can also increase the risk for developing hepatosplenomegaly, which may be seen in those patients with right-sided heart failure.

== Common causes ==
- Infection:
  - Acute viral hepatitis
  - Infectious mononucleosis
  - Cytomegalovirus
  - Rubella
  - Brucella infection
  - Hyper active malaria syndrome
  - Leishmaniasis
  - Fasciolosis
  - Typhoid fever
  - Schistosomiasis or filariasis importants
  - Septicemic plague
  - Histoplasmosis
- Hematologic diseases:
  - Myeloproliferative disease
  - Leukemia
  - Lymphoma
  - Pernicious anaemia
  - Sickle cell anaemia
  - Hereditary Spherocytosis
  - Thalassaemia
  - Myelofibrosis
- Metabolic disease:
  - Niemann-Pick disease
  - Gaucher's disease
  - Hurler's syndrome
- Chronic liver disease and portal hypertension:
  - Chronic active hepatitis
- Amyloidosis
- Acromegaly
- Systemic lupus erythematosus
- Sarcoidosis
- Human African trypanosomiasis
- Drug abuse
- Obesity

== Rare disorders ==
Are the following:

- Lipoprotein lipase deficiency
- Multiple sulfatase deficiency
- Osteopetrosis
- Adult-onset Still's disease (AOSD)
