= Toxic Shock (disambiguation) =

Toxic shock usually refers to a condition caused by bacterial toxins, also known as toxic shock syndrome.

Toxic shock or Toxic Shock may also refer to:

- Toxic Shock (band), an early 1980s Australian post-punk band
- Toxic Shock (novel), a crime novel by Sara Paretsky, published in the US as Blood Shot in 1988
- Toxic Shock: A Social History, a 2018 book by American historian Sharra Louise Vostral
- Toxic Shock Records, a former American record label (1983–1998)
