= Enterotoxin type B =

Enterotoxin produced by the bacteria Staphylococcus aureus

Identifiers
- Organism: Staphylococcus aureus
- Symbol: entB
- Orthologs: OMA: entry
- UniProt: P01552
Search for
- Structures: Swiss-model
- Domains: InterPro

Staphylococcal/Streptococcal toxin, N-terminal domain
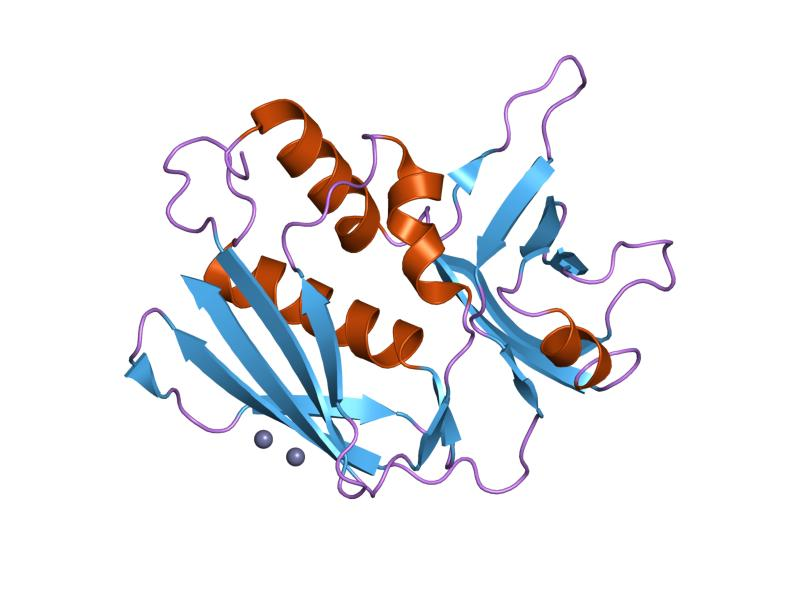
- Crystal structure of the superantigen Spe-H (zinc bound) from Streptococcus pyogenes

Identifiers
- Symbol: Staphylococcal/Streptococcal toxin, N-terminal domain
- Pfam: PF01123
- Pfam clan: CL0658
- ECOD: 2.2.1
- InterPro: IPR006173
- PROSITE: PDOC00250
- SCOP2: 1se3 / SCOPe / SUPFAM
Available protein structures:
- PDB: IPR006173 PF01123 (ECOD; PDBsum)
- AlphaFold: IPR006173; PF01123

Staphylococcal/Streptococcal toxin, beta-grasp domain

Identifiers
- Symbol: Stap_Strp_tox_C
- Pfam: PF02876
- InterPro: IPR006123
- PROSITE: PDOC00250
- SCOP2: 1se3 / SCOPe / SUPFAM
Available protein structures:
- PDB: IPR006123 PF02876 (ECOD; PDBsum)
- AlphaFold: IPR006123; PF02876

In the field of molecular biology, enterotoxin type B, also known as Staphylococcal enterotoxin B (SEB), is an enterotoxin produced by the gram-positive bacteria Staphylococcus aureus. It is a common cause of food poisoning, with severe diarrhea, nausea and intestinal cramping often starting within a few hours of ingestion. Being quite stable, the toxin may remain active even after the contaminating bacteria are killed. It can withstand boiling at 100 °C for a few minutes. Gastroenteritis occurs because SEB is a superantigen, causing the immune system to release a large amount of cytokines that lead to significant inflammation.

Additionally, this protein is one of the causative agents of toxic shock syndrome.

== Function ==
The function of this protein is to facilitate the infection of the host organism. It is a virulence factor designed to induce pathogenesis. One of the major virulence exotoxins is the toxic shock syndrome toxin (TSST), which is secreted by the organism upon successful invasion. It causes a major inflammatory response in the host via superantigenic properties, and is the causative agent of toxic shock syndrome. It functions as a superantigen through activation of a significant fraction of T-cells (up to 20%) by cross-linking MHC class II molecules with T-cell receptors. TSST is a multisystem illness with several symptoms such as high fever, hypotension, dizziness, rash and peeling skin.

== Structure ==
All of these toxins share a similar two-domain fold (N and C-terminal domains) with a long alpha-helix in the middle of the molecule, a characteristic beta-barrel known as the "oligosaccharide/oligonucleotide fold" at the N-terminal domain and a beta-grasp motif at the C-terminal domain. Each superantigen possesses slightly different binding mode(s) when it interacts with MHC class II molecules or the T-cell receptor.

=== N-terminal domain ===
The N-terminal domain is also referred to as OB-fold, or in other words the oligonuclucleotide binding fold. This region contains a low-affinity major histocompatibility complex class II (MHC II) site which causes an inflammatory response.

The N-terminal domain contains regions involved in Major Histocompatibility Complex class II association. It is a five stranded beta barrel that forms an OB fold.

=== C-terminal domain ===
The beta-grasp domain has some structural similarities to the beta-grasp motif present in immunoglobulin-binding domains, ubiquitin, 2Fe-2 S ferredoxin and translation initiation factor 3 as identified by the SCOP database.
