= Rely (tampon) =

1975–1980 American brand of tampon

- Product type: Tampon
- Current owner: Procter & Gamble
- Country: United States
- Introduced: 1975
- Discontinued: 1980
- Markets: United States

Rely was a brand of superabsorbent tampons made by Procter & Gamble starting in 1975. The brand's advertising slogan was "It even absorbs the worry!", and claimed it could hold up longer than the leading tampon, because it was made differently. "Remember, They named it Rely" was the last line of most commercials.

Due to consumer health issues and complaints, as well as mounting legal issues, Rely tampons were removed from the market in 1980.

== Product ==
Rely tampons were made with crosslinked carboxymethylcellulose (an early variety of supersorber) and compressed cubes of a novel hydrophilic polyester foam. After insertion into the vagina the tampon would take on a cup shape that would expand in width, with the intent that the cup would hold menstrual fluids. This differed from other tampons of the era, which were often made with cotton and rayon and would expand in length but not width, which could result in leakage. A Rely tampon was reportedly able to absorb nearly twenty times its own weight in fluid.

== History ==
=== Development and testing ===
Procter & Gamble had just begun to expand their product lines into tampons while they were designing Rely tampons and wanted their product to stand out so that they could compete against more established competing products. They chose to eschew materials that were typically used in tampons in favor of using a modified carboxymethylcellulose, a non-decomposing, edible chemical compound often used to thicken food products. The tampon's cup was composed of polyester non-woven fabric containing both the crosslinked carboxymethyl cellulose and the polyester foam cubes, which gently expanded after being exposed to humidity in the vagina, and was designed to minimize the leakage of menstrual fluid, as it would adapt to the shape of the user's vagina.

The product was test-marketed in Rochester and Fort Wayne during 1974. This predated 1976 changes in the Food and Drug Administration (FDA) and the Medical Device Amendments that would re-categorize menstrual products as medical devices that would now require rigorous testing and pre-approval by the FDA. As the testing occurred prior to 1976, Procter & Gamble was not required to submit their results to the FDA proving Rely's safety due to a grandfather clause.

=== Marketing and release ===
Beginning in 1975, samples of Rely were mailed to women throughout the United States to promote the product through a series of waves. Researcher and historian Sharra Vostral estimates that 45 million sample packs of four tampons were distributed during this campaign. The tampons were advertised as being highly absorbent and capable of absorbing nearly twenty times its own weight in fluid. It is estimated that about 26.3 million women made use of the samples.

== Health problems ==
The superabsorbent properties of Rely caused vaginal dryness by absorbing the natural humidity of the vagina. Often this led to ulcerations in the vaginal wall when the tampon was removed, offering pathways for bacteria to infect the bloodstream. Further, the tampons' superabsorbency meant that the viscosity of vaginal fluids was enhanced, providing an environment conducive to bacterial growth. One user reported to Vostral that the tampon had become so swollen after several hours of usage that she had "[wondered] whether I had lost my virginity, that thing had gotten so huge" and that she discontinued using the tampons after only one use.

Procter & Gamble recalled Rely on September 22, 1980, after the Centers for Disease Control released a report that summer, explaining the bacterial mechanisms which lead to toxic shock syndrome (TSS), and that Rely tampons were associated with TSS more than any other tampon. As part of the voluntary recall, Procter & Gamble entered into a consent agreement with the FDA "providing for a program for notification to consumers and retrieval of the product from the market". It was revealed in a 1989 court that the company set up a reserve of $150 million before taxes and $75 million after taxes for 1981 to cover the costs of pulling the product off the market.

== Legal issues ==
In March 1982, a Federal jury found that the Procter & Gamble Company was negligent and offered a defective product when it put Rely tampons on the market, but it did not award any damages to a Colorado teenager who sued the company. In April 1982, a Federal jury found Procter & Gamble Company liable for the death from toxic shock syndrome of a woman who used its Rely tampons, and ordered the company to pay her husband $300,000 in actual damages. In August 1982, the company settled a suit with an 18-year-old woman who asserted that she contracted toxic shock syndrome after using Rely, for an undisclosed amount.
