= Toxic Shock: A Social History =

Book about the evolution of pads and tampons

Toxic Shock
- Cover demonstrating a tampon
- Author: Sharra Louise Vostral
- Language: English
- Series: Biopolitics
- Release number: 6 out of 22
- Publisher: New York University Press
- Publication date: 27 November 2018
- Publication place: United States
- Media type: Print (hardcover) / Digital
- Pages: 229
- ISBN: 978-1-4798-7784-3
- OCLC: 1031956695
- Preceded by: Biopolitics: An Advanced Introduction
- Followed by: Personalized Medicine: Empowered Patients in the 21st Century?

Toxic Shock: A Social History is a book about the evolution of pads and tampons, as well as the toxic shock syndrome, written by historian Sharra Louise Vostral and published by New York University Press on 27 November 2018.
