= Drug-induced aseptic meningitis =

Meningitis caused by drugs

Drug-induced aseptic meningitis (DIAM) is a type of aseptic meningitis related to the use of medications such as nonsteroidal anti-inflammatory drugs (NSAIDs) or biologic drugs such as intravenous immunoglobulin (IVIG). Additionally, this condition generally shows clinical improvement after cessation of the medication, as well as a tendency to relapse with resumption of the medication.

== Signs and symptoms ==
The signs and symptoms of DIAM are similar to infectious meningitis including but not limited to headache, fever, neck stiffness, altered mental status and other neurological deficits such as numbness, paresthesias, seizure or weakness. Notably, the patient will have had recent exposure to one of the causative medications.

== Causes ==
The following is a list of medications associated with DIAM.

- Nonsteroidal anti-inflammatory drugs (NSAIDs)
- Biologic drugs such as intravenous immunoglobulin (IVIG).
- Antibiotics such as sulfonamides, isoniazid, ciprofloxacin, penicillin
- Antiepileptic drugs such as carbamazepine and lamotrigine
- Phenazopyridine
- Monoclonal antibodies such as infliximab, adalimumab, etanercept, efalizumab, cetuximab, and OKT3 antibodies.
- Chemotherapeutic drugs such as pemetrexed and cytarabine.
- Zimelidine (SSRI that is no longer available)
- Azathioprine
- Methotrexate
- Allopurinol
- Ranitidine

== Pathophysiology ==
Meningitis, whether acute or chronic, is by definition an inflammation of the meninges. This can be due to both infectious or non-infectious reasons. DIAM is a noninfectious meningitis that is associated with the use of certain medications listed above. The pathogenesis of DIAM is poorly understood and may be related to autoimmune hypersensitivity reactions, although it may vary depending on the inciting medication. For instance, DIAM caused by OKT3 antibodies may be mediated by cytokine release rather than hypersensitivity reactions. There is an association with certain underlying conditions such as systemic lupus erythematosus (SLE), and other underlying conditions that were present in a small amount of patients included Sjögren syndrome, idiopathic thrombocytopenic purpura, rheumatoid arthritis, HIV, and Crohn's disease.

== Diagnosis ==
Historically, the process of diagnosis involved attempting to identify any infectious causes as these may be treatable with antibiotics or other medications. Lumbar puncture would be performed to collect cerebral spinal fluid (CSF) to culture for bacterial growth. Growth indicated a bacterial meningitis, while no growth indicated another cause denoted "aseptic" meningitis. The most common form of this is viral meningitis. Recent medical advances allows rapid polymerase chain reaction (PCR) testing that analyzes the CSF for DNA or RNA. This can quickly determine if there are bacterial or viral species present in the CSF. If these are ruled out, as well as other causes such as parasitic or fungal causes, then the cause of the meningitis is likely noninfectious in nature. DIAM is among these noninfectious causes of aseptic meningitis.

Once infectious causes ruled out, noninfectious causes should be investigated. These include a history of chemical irritation from recent surgery or chemicals injected into the subarachnoid space such as spinal anesthesia, other inflammatory or vascular conditions such as sarcoidosis or vasculitis, as well as Neoplastic conditions such as lymphoma.

CSF analysis tends to show inflammatory changes in DIAM such as elevated white blood cells and elevated protein levels. Glucose was either normal or low. MRI and CT imaging of the brain has shown changes consistent with Blood-brain barrier disruption or cerebral edema including T2-weighted changes that were normalized after resolution of the condition.

In patients with SLE, DIAM should be distinguished from lupus aseptic meningitis (LAM). This can be done by CSF analysis (DIAM has a neutrophilic predominance while LAM has a lymphocytic predominance), as well as assessment of relevant labs such as complement levels and signs of Lupus flareup.

== Treatment ==
Immediate cessation of offending medications.

== Prognosis ==
Generally, excellent prognosis with complete recovery if the offending medication is ceased.

== Epidemiology ==
Drug induced aseptic meningitis occurrence is a subgroup of the occurrence of aseptic meningitis in general, which is approximately 20 per 100,000, but the most common cause of aseptic meningitis is viral.
