= Sharra L. Vostral =

American professor of history

- Born: Sharra Louise Vostral; March 9, 1968 (age 58)
- Other name: Sharra Vostral
- Occupation: Professor
- Notable work: Under Wraps: A History of Menstrual Hygiene Technology; Toxic Shock: A Social History

Sharra Louise Vostral is an American historian who currently works as a professor of communication studies at Northwestern University. Vostral is affiliated with both women's, gender & sexuality studies, and American studies. Her research centers upon the history of technology, specifically gender, and histories of medical devices and health. She has written two books about menstruation and history: Under Wraps: A History of Menstrual Hygiene Technology and Toxic Shock: A Social History.

== Biography ==
Vostral received her Ph.D. in history at Washington University in St. Louis. She completed her M.A. in American studies at St. Louis University, and earned honors in comparative religion at the University of Michigan, Ann Arbor. She taught science and technology studies at Rensselaer Polytechnic Institute, moving to the University of Illinois Urbana-Champaign to teach gender & women’s studies and history in 2007. She was a professor of history and science and technology at Purdue University from 2013 to mid-2023, at which point she moved to Northwestern University.

=== Research ===
In her book Under Wraps: A History of Menstrual Hygiene Technology, Vostral presents and defines the menstrual hygiene technology sector in the United States. She shows how, in the United States, for the better part of the twentieth century, menstruation went hand-in-glove with menstrual hygiene. But how and why did this occur? The book looks at the social history of menstrual hygiene by examining it as a technology. In doing so, the lens of technology provides a way to think about menstrual artifacts, how the artifacts are used, and how women gained the knowledge and skills to use them. As technological users, women developed great savvy in manipulating belts, pins, and pads, and using tampons to effectively mask their entire menstrual period. This masking is a form of passing, though it is not often thought of in that way. By using a technology of passing, a woman might pass temporarily as a non-bleeder, which could help her perform her work duties and not get fired or maintain social engagements like swimming at a summer party and not be marked as having her period. How women use technologies of passing, and the resulting politics of secrecy, are a part of women's history that has remained under wraps. Vostral's conceptualisation of pads and tampons as technologies, and her use of 'passing' provided important intellectual frameworks for the field of Critical Menstrual Studies.

Toxic Shock: A Social History provided the first academic history of TSS. Vostral shows how commercial interests negatively impacted women's health outcomes; the insufficient testing of the first super-absorbent tampons; and how TSS became a 'women's disease,' for which women must constantly monitor their own bodies. A study at the intersection of public health and social history, this book brings to light the complexities behind a stigmatized and underdiscussed issue in women's reproductive health. Importantly, it warns that as we move forward with joint replacements, implants, and internal medical devices, we must understand the relationship of technology to bacteria and recognize that their interactions within the human body can bring about unexpected, and sometimes deadly, consequences
