= Toxic shock syndrome toxin-1 =

Superantigen

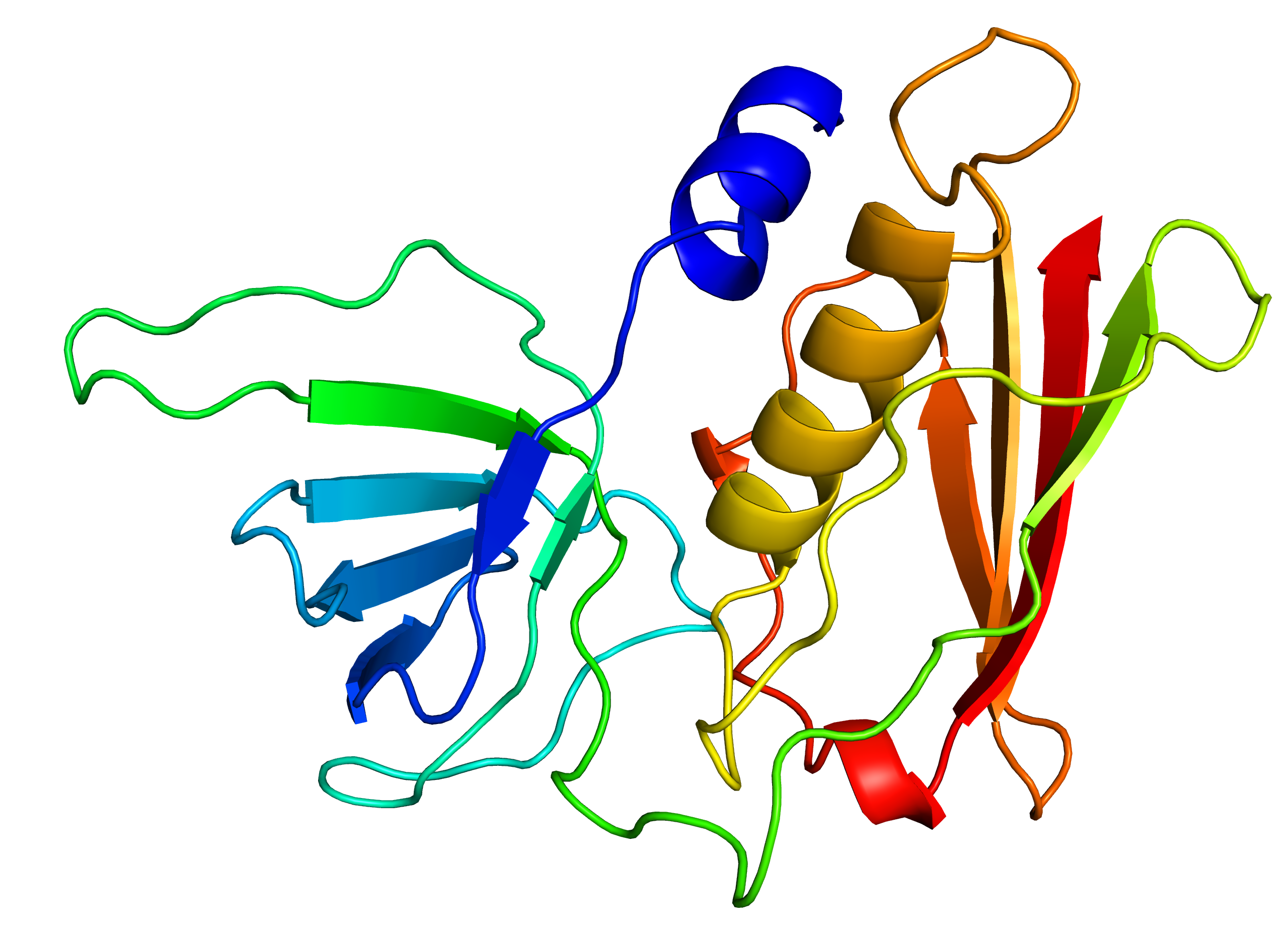
- Crystallographic structure of TSST-1

Identifiers
- Organism: Staphylococcus aureus
- Symbol: tst
- Orthologs: OMA: entry
- PDB: 3TSS
- RefSeq (Prot): WP_001035596.1
- UniProt: P06886
Search for
- Structures: Swiss-model
- Domains: InterPro

Toxic shock syndrome toxin-1 (TSST-1) is a superantigen with a size of 22 kDa produced by 5 to 25% of Staphylococcus aureus isolates. It causes toxic shock syndrome (TSS) by stimulating the release of large amounts of interleukin-1, interleukin-2 and tumor necrosis factor. In general, the toxin is not produced by bacteria growing in the blood; rather, it is produced at the local site of an infection, and then enters the blood stream.

== Characteristics ==
Toxic shock syndrome toxin-1 (TSST-1), a prototype superantigen secreted by a Staphylococcus aureus bacterium strain in susceptible hosts, acts on the vascular system by causing inflammation, fever, and shock. The bacterium strain that produces the TSST-1 can be found in any area of the body, but lives mostly in the vagina of infected women. TSST-1 is a bacterial exotoxin found in patients who have developed toxic shock syndrome (TSS), which can be found in menstruating women or any man or child for that matter. One-third of all TSS cases have been found in men. This statistic could possibly be due to surgical wounds or any skin wound. TSST-1 is the cause of half of non-menstrual TSS cases, and the sole cause for menstrual TSS cases.

== Structure ==
In the nucleotide sequence of TSST-1, there is a 708 base-pair open-reading frame and a Shine-Dalgarno sequence which is seven base pairs downstream from the start site. In the entire nucleotide sequence, only 40 amino acids make up the signal peptide. A single signal peptide consists of a 1 to 3 basic amino acid terminus, a hydrophobic region of 15 residues, a proline (Pro) or glycine (Gly) in the hydrophobic core region, a serine (Ser) or threonine (Thr) amino acid near the carboxyl terminal end of the hydrophobic core, and an alanine (Ala) or glycine (Gly) at the cleavage site. A mature TSST-1 protein has a coding sequence of 585 base pairs. The entire nucleotide sequence was determined by Blomster-Hautamaazg, et al., as well as by other researchers with other experiments. Consisting of a single polypeptide chain, the structure of holotoxin TSST-1 is three-dimensional and consists of an alpha (α) and beta (β) domain. This three-dimensional structure of the TSST-1 protein was determined by purifying the crystals of the protein. The two domains are adjacent from each other and possess unique qualities. Domain A, the larger of the two domains, contains residues 1-17 and 90–194 in TSST-1 and consists of a long alpha (α) helix with residues 125-140 surrounded by a 5-strand beta (β) sheet. Domain B is unique because it contains residues 18–89 in TSST-1 and consists of a (β) barrel made up of 5 β-strands. Crystallography methods show that the internal β-barrel of domain B contains several hydrophobic amino acids and hydrophilic residues on the surface of the domain, which allows TSST-1 to cross mucous surfaces of epithelial cells. Even though TSST-1 consists of several hydrophobic amino acids, this protein is highly soluble in water. TSST-1 is resistant to heat and proteolysis. It has been shown that TSST-1 can be boiled for more than an hour without any presence of denaturation or direct effect on its function.

== Production ==
TSST-1 is a protein encoded by the tst gene, which is part of the mobile genetic element staphylococcal pathogenicity island 1. The toxin is produced in the greatest volumes during the post-exponential phase of growth, which is similar among pyrogenic toxin superantigens, also known as PTSAgs. Oxygen is required in order to produce TSST-1, in addition to the presence of animal protein, low levels of glucose, and temperatures between 37–40 °C (99–104 °F). Production is optimal at pH's close to neutral and when magnesium levels are low, and is further amplified by high concentrations of S. aureus, which indicates its importance in establishing infection.

TSST-1 differs from other PTSAgs in that its genetic sequence does not have a homolog with other superantigen sequences. TSST-1 does not have a cysteine loop, which is an important structure in other PTSAgs. TSST-1 is also different from other PTSAgs in its ability to cross mucous membranes, which is why it is an important factor in menstrual TSS. When the protein is translated, it is in a pro-protein form, and can only leave the cell once the signal sequence has been cleaved off. The agr (accessory gene regulator) locus (Note: When active during bacterial colonisation, this gene locus is also called exp agr, referring to the exponential phase (or log phase) of bacterial growth, before expression of other genes down-regulates agr, and growth enters its stationary phase.) is one of the key sites of positive regulation for many of the S. aureus genes, including TSST-1. Additionally, alterations in the expression of the genes ssrB and srrAB affect the transcription of TSST-1. Further, high levels of glucose inhibit transcription, since glucose acts as a catabolite repressor.

=== Mutations ===
Based on studies of various mutations of the protein it appears that the superantigenic and lethal portions of the protein are separate. One variant in particular, TSST-ovine or TSST-O, was important in determining the regions of biological importance in TSST-1. TSST-O does not cause TSS, and is non-mitogenic, and differs in sequence from TSST-1 in 14 nucleotides, which corresponds to 9 amino acids. Two of these are cleaved off as part of the signal sequence, and are therefore not important in the difference in function observed. From the studies observing the differences in these two proteins, it was discovered that residue 135 is critical in both lethality and mitogenicity, while mutations in residues 132 and 136 caused the protein to lose its ability to cause TSS, however there were still signs of superantigenicity. If the lysine at residue 132 in TSST-O is changed to a glutamate, the mutant regains little superantigenicity, but becomes lethal, meaning that the ability to cause TSS results from the glutamate at residue 132. The loss of activity from these mutations is not due to changes in the protein's conformation, but instead these residues appear to be critical in the interactions with T-cell receptors.

== Isolation ==
Samples of TSST-1 can be purified from bacterial cultures to use in in vitro testing environments, however this is not ideal due to the large number of factors that contribute to pathogenesis in an in vivo environment. Additionally, culturing bacteria in vitro provides an environment which is rich in nutrients, in contrast to the reality of an in vivo environment, in which nutrients tend to be more scarce. TSST-1 can be purified by preparative isoelectric focusing for use in vitro or for animal models using a mini-osmotic pump.

== Mechanism ==
A superantigen such as TSST-1 stimulates human T cells that express VB 2, which may represent 5-30% of all host T cells. PTSAgs induce the VB-specific expansion of both CD4 and CD8- subsets of T-lymphocytes. TSST-1 forms homodimers in most of its known crystal forms. The SAGs show remarkably conserved architecture and are divided into the N- and C- terminal domains. Mutational analysis has mapped the putative TCR binding region of TSST-1 to a site located on the back-side groove. If the TCR occupies this site, the amino terminal alpha helix forms a large wedge between the TCR and MHC class II molecules. The wedge would physically separate the TCR from the MHC class II molecules. A novel domain may exist in the SAGs that is separate from the TCR and class II MHC-binding domains. The domain consists of residues 150 to 161 in SEB, and similar regions exist in all the other SAGs as well. In this study a synthetic peptide containing this sequence was able to prevent SAG-induced lethality in D-galactosamine-sensitized mice with staphylococcal TSST-1, as well as some other SAGs. Significant differences exist in the sequences of MHC Class II alleles and TCR Vbeta elements expressed by different species, and these differences have important effects on the interaction of PTSAgs and with MCH class II and TCR molecules.

=== Binding site ===
TSST-1 binds primarily to the alpha-chain of class II MHC exclusively through a low-affinity (or generic) binding site on the SAG N-terminal domain. This is opposed to other super antigens (SAGs) such as DEA and SEE, that bind to class II MHC through the low-affinity site, and to the beta-chain through a high-affinity site. This high-affinity site is a zinc-dependent site on the SAG C-terminal domain. When this site is bound, it extends over part of the binding groove, makes contacts with the bound peptide, and then binds regions of both the alpha and beta chains. MHC-binding by TSST-1 is partially peptide-dependent. Mutagenesis studies with SEA have indicated that both binding sites are required for optimal T-cell activation. These studies containing TSST-1 indicate that the TCR binding domain lies at the top of the back side of this toxin, though the complete interaction remains to be determined. There have also been indications that the TCR binding site of TSST-1 is mapped to the major groove of the central alpha helix or the short amino terminal alpha helix. Residues in the beta claw motif of TSST-1 are known to interact primarily with the invariant region of the Alpha chain of this MHC class II molecule. Residues forming minor contacts with TSST-1 were also identified in the HLA-DR1 β-chain, as well as the antigenic peptide, located in the interchain groove. The arrangement of TSST-1 with respect to the MHC class II molecule imposes steric restriction on the three component complex composed of TSST-1, MHC class II, and the TCR.

=== Mutational analysis ===
Initial studies of mutants revealed that residues on the back side of the central alpha helix were required for super antigenic activity. Changing the histidine at position 135 to alanine caused TSST-1 to be neither lethal or superantigenic. Changes in residues that were in close proximity to H135A, also had the effect of diminishing the lethality and superantigenic quality of these mutants. Although most of these mutants did not result in loss of antigenicity of TSST-1. Tests done using mutagenic TSST-1 toxins indicated that the lethal and superantigenic properties are separable. When Lys-132 in TSST-O was changed to a Glu, the resulting mutant became completely lethal but non superantigenic. The same results, lethal but not superantigenic, were found for TSST-1 Gly16Val. Residues Gly16, Glu132, and Gln 136, located on the back of the back-side groove of the putative TCR binding region of TSST-1, it has been proposed that they are also a part of a second functionally lethal site in the TSST-1.
