= Microvasculitis =

Microvasculitis refers to a range of diseases or presentations associated with a disease, where there is inflammation of small blood vessels:

- Kawasaki disease
- Susac syndrome

== Nerve microvasculitis ==
- Non-systemic vasculitic neuropathy (NSVN)
- Hepatitis C-related cryoglobulinemia neuropathy (CRYOVASC)
- Hepatitis B-associated PAN
- Diabetic lumbosacral radiculoplexus neuropathy (DLRPN)
- Non-diabetic lumbosacral radiculoplexus neuropathy (LRPN)
- Diabetic cervical-radiculoplexus neuropathy (DCRPN)
- Diabetic Cranio-Cervico-Radiculoplexus Neuropathy
- Diabetic Cervical Neuropathy
