= Tomisaku Kawasaki =

Japanese pediatrician (1925–2020)

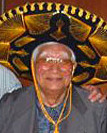
- Kawasaki in 2005
- Born: 1 February 1925; Tokyo, Japan
- Died: 5 June 2020 (aged 95); Tokyo, Japan
- Education: Chiba University (MD)
- Occupation: Pediatrician
- Years active: 1948–2019
- Known for: Describing Kawasaki disease
- Children: 3
- Medical career
- Institutions: Japan Red Cross Medical Center, Hiroo
- Sub-specialties: Pediatrics

Tomisaku Kawasaki (川崎 富作, Kawasaki Tomisaku; February 1, 1925 – June 5, 2020) was a Japanese pediatrician who first described the condition now known as Kawasaki disease in the 1960s. Alongside rheumatic heart disease, Kawasaki disease is considered to be the leading cause of acquired heart disease in children worldwide.

== Early life and education ==
Tomisaku Kawasaki was born on 1 February 1925 in the Asakusa district of Tokyo, as the youngest of seven children. He was "very interested in plants and fruit, and surprised to learn how the 20th-century pear had suddenly appeared", but eventually abandoned plans to study botany because his mother favored him to be a physician. He studied medicine at Chiba University, graduating in 1948.

== Career ==
Kawasaki conducted his medical internship year in Chiba and decided to specialize in pediatrics, due to his fondness for children. Medical residency in post-war Japan was unpaid and as his family suffered financial problems, his advisor recommended he take up a paid position at the Japan Red Cross Medical Center in Hiroo, Tokyo. He would later practice as a pediatrician there for over 40 years.

After 10 years of researching milk allergy and unusual host-parasite cases, he saw a 4-year-old boy presenting with a myriad of clinical signs he later termed "mucocutaneous lymph node syndrome" (MCLS) in 1961. In 1962, he saw a second patient with the same constellation of symptoms. After he had collected a series of seven cases, he presented them at a meeting of the Japanese Pediatric Association. Reviewers rejected his submission for publication because they did not believe it was a new disease entity. Opposition from several academics over the alleged discovery of the new disease lasted several years. After he had collected a total of 50 cases, his 44-page paper was published in the Japanese Journal of Allergy in 1967. The paper included comprehensive hand-drawn diagrams of each patient's rashes and has been described as "one of the most beautiful examples of descriptive clinical writing". Other colleagues across the country soon reported similar cases.

In 1970, the Ministry of Health and Welfare established a research committee on MCLS headed by Dr. Fumio Kosaki. This committee conducted a nationwide study on the disease, confirming it was a new disease which specifically affected arteries across the body. In 1973, a pathologist discovered the connection to cardiac disease when he found a child with Kawasaki disease had coronary artery thrombosis at an autopsy. Kawasaki headed the Kawasaki Disease Research Committee which published its findings in the journal Pediatrics in 1974; He has been called "part Sherlock Holmes and part Charles Dickens for his sense of mystery and his vivid descriptions". It was the first time MCLS was published in English and brought international attention to the disease.

Kawasaki retired in 1990 and established the Japan Kawasaki Disease Research Center, which he led as director until 2019 and honorary chairman until 2020. In 1992, Kawasaki disease was officially added to Nelson's Textbook of Pediatrics, a leading textbook in the specialty, cementing international recognition of the disease.

In 2007, Kawasaki estimated over 200,000 cases of Kawasaki disease had been diagnosed in Japan since the research committee's findings in 1970. Kawasaki himself never referred to the disease by its eponymous name but conceded that the original name was too long.

== Personal life and death ==
Kawasaki was married to fellow pediatrician Reiko Kawasaki who died in 2019. He died on 5 June 2020 of natural causes at the age of 95 years old. He was survived by his two daughters and a son. Obituaries paying tribute to Kawasaki were published in medical journals worldwide in the aftermath of his death.

== Awards ==
- Bering Kitasato Award, 1986
- Takeda Medical Award, 1987
- Health Culture Award, 1987
- Japan Medical Association Medical Award, 1988
- Asahi Prize, 1989
- Japan Academy Prize, 1991
- Tokyo Cultural Award, 1996
- Japan Pediatric Society Prize, 2006
- At some time prior to 2007, he had a personal audience with the Emperor and Empress of Japan at the Imperial Palace.
- Honored by the Tokyo Metropolitan Government

== Selected publications ==
- Kawasaki T. (1967) Acute febrile mucocutaneous syndrome with lymphoid involvement with specific desquamation of the fingers and toes in children. Arerugi. 16 (3):178-222 (in Japanese).
- Kawasaki, T.; Kosaki, F.; Okawa, S.; Shigematsu, I.; Yanagawa, H. (1974). "A new infantile acute febrile mucocutaneous lymph node syndrome (MLNS) prevailing in Japan". Pediatrics. 54 (3): 271–276. ISSN 0031-4005. PMID 4153258.
- Kato, Shunichi; Kimura, Mikio; Tsuji, Kimiyoshi; Kusakawa, Sanji; Asai, Toshio; Juji, Takeo; Kawasaki, Tomisaku (1 February 1978). "HLA Antigens in Kawasaki Disease". Pediatrics. 61 (2): 252–255. ISSN 0031-4005. PMID 634680.
- Shigematsu, I; Shibata, S; Tamashiro, H; Kawasaki, T; Kusakawa, S (September 1979). "Kawasaki disease continues to increase in Japan". Pediatrics. 64 (3): 386. PMID 481984.
- Yanagawa, Hiroshi; Kawasaki, Tomisaku; Shigematsu, Itsuzo (1 July 1987). "Nationwide Survey on Kawasaki Disease in Japan". Pediatrics. 80 (1): 58–62. ISSN 0031-4005. PMID 3601519.
- Fujita, Yasuyuki; Nakamura, Yosikazu; Sakata, Kiyomi; Hara, Norihisa; Kobayashi, Masayo; Nagai, Masaki; Yanagawa, Hiroshi; Kawasaki, Tomisaku (1 October 1989). "Kawasaki Disease in Families". Pediatrics. 84 (4): 666–669. ISSN 0031-4005. PMID 2780128.
- Burns, Jane C.; Shike, Hiroko; Gordon, John B.; Malhotra, Alka; Schoenwetter, Melissa; Kawasaki, Tomisaku (July 1996). "Sequelae of Kawasaki disease in adolescents and young adults". Journal of the American College of Cardiology. 28 (1): 253–257. doi:10.1016/0735-1097(96)00099-X. PMID 8752822.
