= COVID-19 datasets =

Datasets on COVID-19

COVID-19 datasets are public databases for sharing case data and medical information related to the COVID-19 pandemic.

== Aggregate statistics ==
=== United States ===
==== Volunteer/non-government ====
Publisher	Date of first publication	In official use?	Update Frequency	Geographic Level	Timeseries	Testing Sites	Testing Number	Cases	Hospitalizations	Deaths	Vaccination Sites	Vaccination Number	Description
Coders Against COVID/GISCorps	March 22, 2020	Yes, by FEMA and State of California	Daily	Point (lat/long)	Yes	Yes	No	No	No	No	Yes	No	A dataset of COVID-19 testing locations in the United States and Puerto Rico
USAFacts	April 24, 2020	Yes, by CDC	Daily	County	Yes	No	No	Yes		Yes	No	No	A dataset of county-level coronavirus cases and deaths that is updated daily
COVID Tracking Project	March 7, 2020	No	Daily	State	Yes	No	Yes	Yes	Yes	Yes	No	No	A volunteer-run database of testing and medical stats in the United States
Sentiment Analysis of users reviews on COVID-19 contact tracing mobile applications	March 2021												This dataset is intended to support sentiment analysis of users' reviews on COVID-19 contact tracing mobile applications.

==== U.S. Department of Health & Human Services ====
Name	Geographic Level	Timeseries	Testing Sites	Testing Number	Cases	Hospitalizations	Deaths	Vaccination Sites	Vaccination Number
COVID-19 Diagnostic Laboratory Testing (PCR Testing) Time Series	State	Yes	No	Yes	No	No	No	No	No
COVID-19 Reported Patient Impact and Hospital Capacity by Facility	Point (lat/long)	Yes	No	No	No	Yes	No	No	No
COVID-19 Estimated Patient Impact and Hospital Capacity by State	State	No	No	No	No	Yes	No	No	No
COVID-19 Reported Patient Impact and Hospital Capacity by State	State	No	No	No	No	Yes	No	No	No
COVID-19 Reported Patient Impact and Hospital Capacity by State Timeseries	State	Yes	No	No	No	Yes	No	No	No

=== Global ===
- Johns Hopkins Coronavirus Resource Center: Global aggregated data including cases, testing, contact tracing, and vaccine development
- World Health Organization (WHO) Coronavirus Disease Dashboard: a database of confirmed cases and deaths reported globally and broken down by region. This database is part of the WHO Health Data Platform.
- COVID-19 Africa Open Data Project: a volunteer-run database and dashboard reporting region, country and district level case counts, deaths, healthcare worker infections, healthcare services and urgent needs.

== Data hubs ==
- Health Data Research UK provides a searchable registry of health data resources from the United Kingdom, including COVID-19 related datasets.
- NIH Open Access Datasets: The National Institutes of Health provide open-access data and computational resources related to COVID-19.
- COVID-19 Open Research Dataset (CORD-19): The Semantic Scholar project of the Allen Institute for AI hosts CORD-19, a public dataset of academic articles about COVID-19 and related research. The dataset is updated daily and includes both peer-reviewed articles and preprints. CORD-19 was originally released on March 16, 2020, by researchers and leaders from the Allen Institute for AI, Chan Zuckerberg Initiative, Georgetown University's Center for Security and Emerging Technhology, Microsoft, and the National Library of Medicine. The dataset is created through the use of text mining of the current research literature.

== Topic-specific and special-interest resources ==
=== Genomics ===
- Consensus genome data for SARS-CoV-2 is available through GISAID for registered users and included in an interactive Phylogenetic tree dashboard on Nextstrain, an open-source pathogen genome data project.

=== Imaging (Radiology) ===
- Characteristic imaging features on chest radiographs and computed tomography (CT) of people who are symptomatic include asymmetric peripheral ground-glass opacities without pleural effusions. The University of Montreal and Mila created the "COVID-19 Image Data Collection" in March which is a public data repository of chest imaging. The Medical Imaging Databank in Valencian Region released a large dataset of chest imaging from Spain. The Italian Radiological Society is compiling an international online database of imaging findings for confirmed cases. Online radiology case sharing platforms such as Eurorad and Radiopaedia serve as platforms for sharing COVID-19 case data and imaging.
