= BURISA =

BURISA (British Urban and Regional Information Systems Association) was an informal, non-profit organisation, unincorporated association of practitioners, based in the UK, whose common interest is the use and management of information and the development of information systems for public services.

Its interests covered a wide range of information systems for public planning, policy making and service provision. BURISA aimed to promote better communication between people concerned with information and information systems within local and central government, the health services, utilities and the academic world through its regular newsletter and also periodic conferences and workshops.

BURISA was affiliated to the Royal Statistical Society (RSS) through its membership of the Statistics User Forum.

In 2013 the organisation merged with the Local Area Research + Intelligence Association (LARIA).

== See also ==
- Journal of the Royal Statistical Society
- Urban and Regional Information Systems Association (URISA)
