= Geospatial Professional Network =

Nonprofit organization supporting professionals using Geographic Information Systems

- Official Logo since 2024
- Formation: 1966; 60 years ago
- Type: Nonprofit
- Tax ID no.: 23-7028474
- Purpose: Geospatial Professional Development
- Headquarters: Des Plaines, Illinois, U.S.
- Coordinates: 42.0402424°N 87.9070285°W
- Region served: United States & Canada
- Executive Director: Wendy Nelson
- Website: https://thegpn.org/
- Formerly called: Urban and Regional Information Systems Association (URISA) (1966–2024)

The Geospatial Professional Network (GPN) is a non-profit association of professionals using geographic information systems (GIS) and other information technologies to solve using geospatial technology. GPN was formerly known as Urban and Regional Information Systems Association (URISA) from 1966 to 2024. GPN promotes the effective and ethical use of spatial information and technology for the understanding and management of urban and regional systems.

== History ==
Previous logo and name of the organization (1966-2024)

URISA was formed in 1966, evolving from a loosely associated group of professionals with a common interest in urban planning information systems. The organization emanated from annual conferences held from 1963 through 1966, known then as the Annual Conference on Urban Planning Information Systems and Programs. URISA has since evolved into an international organization supporting professionals with interests in a variety of topics related to development and effective management of geographic information systems (GIS). URISA is currently headquartered in Des Plaines, Illinois, where professional staff handle the administrative functions of the association. URISA is currently run by Wendy Nelson.

In 2024, URISA announced that it would rebrand, and rename, itself the Geospatial Professional Network (GPN).

== Activities ==
GPN is the founding member of the GIS Certification Institute, which administers professional certification for the field. GPN is also a founding member of the Coalition of Geospatial Organizations (COGO), a coalition of organizations concerned with U.S. national geospatial issues. GISCorps is a GPN program that provides volunteer GIS services for underdeveloped countries worldwide. GPN's proposed GIS Capability Maturity Model (GIS CMM) provides the means for local governments to gauge their progress in achieving GIS operational maturity against a variety of standards and measures.

GPN promotes data sharing by government organizations, and has approved policy to reflect those values.

GPN hosts a number of conferences each year including GIS-Pro: URISA's Annual Conference for GIS Professionals; the GIS/CAMA Technologies Conference, co-sponsored by the International Association of Assessing Officers; the URISA/NENA Addressing Conference, co-sponsored by the National Emergency Number Association; an annual conference held in California called California GIS (aka CalGIS); a biennial GIS in Public Health Conference; Caribbean GIS Conference; and the URISA Leadership Academy, a five-day GIS leadership program.

GPN supports more than two-dozen chapters, primarily across the United States and Canada, with recent expansion into the Caribbean and the United Arab Emirates.

The URISA Journal is a quarterly, peer-reviewed, scholarly publication of the organization. It has a history of open access. URISA additionally maintains a growing publications library. Through an annual competition GPN encourages students to submit a paper for a special section of the URISA Journal.

GPN also recognizes achievements in the industry through a variety of awards, including Exemplary Systems in Government Awards (ESIG) the URISA GIS Hall of Fame, and the Horwood Distinguished Service Award.

== Membership ==
GPN members are professionals in the spatial data industry working in local, regional, state/provincial, tribal and federal government, academia, the private sector, and non-profit organizations.

== See also ==
- American Congress on Surveying and Mapping
- American Society for Photogrammetry and Remote Sensing (ASPRS)
- British Urban and Regional Information Systems Association (BURISA)
