= Endotheliitis =

Inflammation of lining of blood vessels

Endotheliitis is an immune response within the endothelium in blood vessels, in which they become inflamed. The condition can cause oedema of the surrounding tissue, including the stroma, and can cause irritation and pain. If it is within the cornea, it can result in permanent loss of vision. The condition can be caused by a number of factors, such as mumps and cytomegalovirus under certain circumstances.
