= GISCorps =

- Founded: October 2003
- Location: United States
- Products: Geographic information system
- Website: www.giscorps.org

GISCorps, founded in 2003, is a program initiated by the Urban and Regional Information Systems Association (URISA) that offers volunteer GIS services to under-served developing communities worldwide.

This volunteer based organization is headed by a team of professionals trained in urban and regional development. GISCorps has approximately 10,000 volunteers located in five continents and prepared to work on both domestic and international projects. Their services are used for supplementing humanitarian relief, enhancing environmental analysis and fostering economic as well as community development. They promote the use of information technology for more accurate and efficient means of illustrating and improving the civic infrastructure of a region.

== Projects ==
GISCorps has assisted in the following projects:

- Filtering Data for Hurricane Matthew in 2016
- Data Collection in Burundi
- Mission with World Food Programme in North Korea during 2016
- Geocoding Locations in Niger
- COVID-19 Testing and Vaccination Sites Data Creation Project
  - This project was launched in collaboration with Coders Against COVID, and recognized as the FEMA App of the Week in a bulletin issued by the federal agency on April 24, 2020.
