= Italian Society of Medical and Interventional Radiology =

The Italian Society of Medical and Interventional Radiology (Italian: Società Italiana di Radiologia Medica e Interventistica) is a medical association of Italian radiologists, consisting of about 11,000 members (in 2019).
