= Multisystem inflammatory syndrome in children =

Disease of children; pediatric comorbidity from COVID-19

Paediatric multisystem inflammatory syndrome
- Other names: Multisystem inflammatory syndrome in children (MIS-C); Multisystem inflammatory syndrome (MIS) in children and adolescents temporally related to COVID-19; Paediatric inflammatory multisystem syndrome (PIMS), temporally associated with SARS-CoV-2 infection (PIMS-TS); Kawa-COVID-19; Systemic Inflammatory Syndrome in COVID-19 (SISCoV)
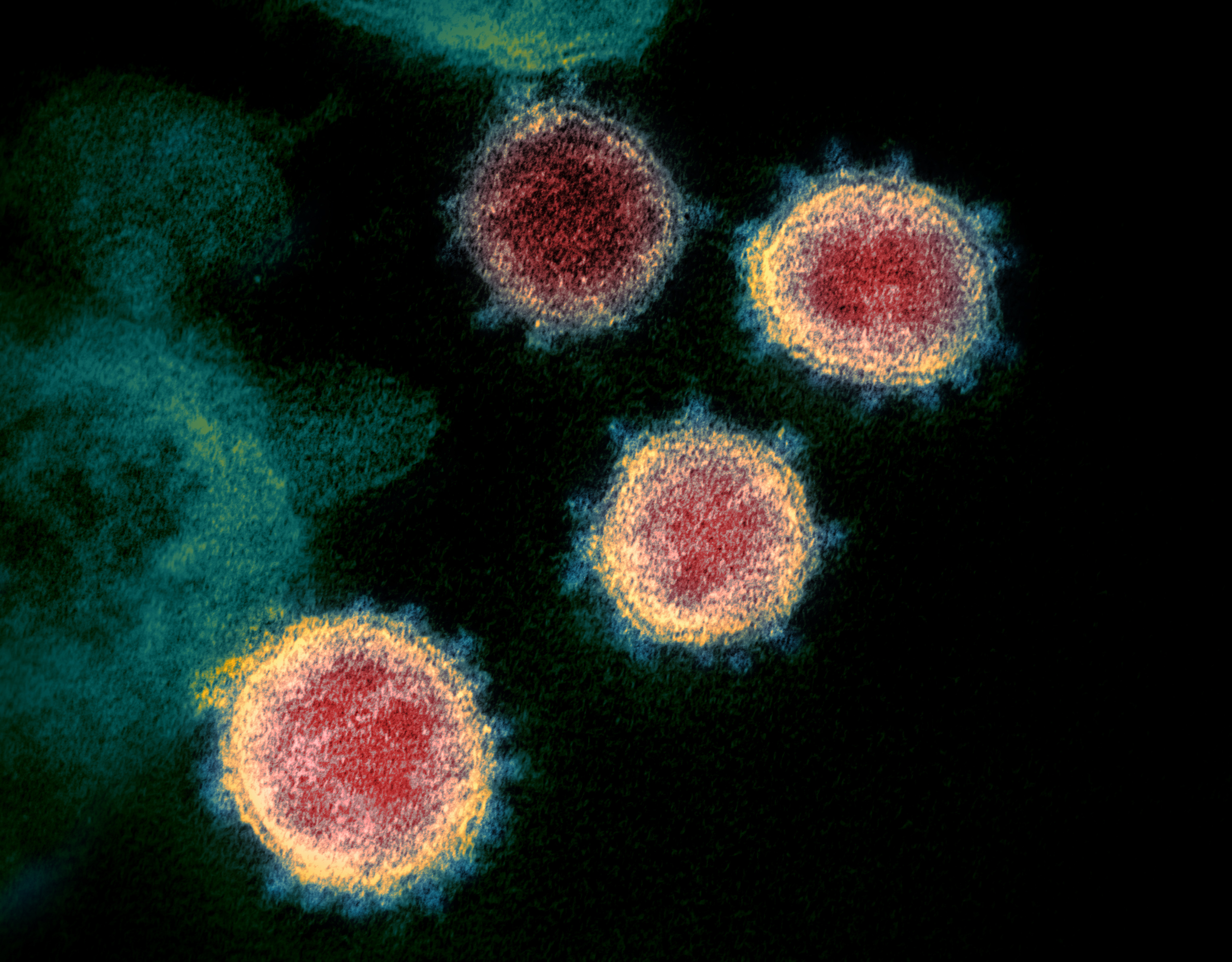
- TEM image of SARS-CoV-2, the coronavirus responsible for COVID-19: PMIS / MIS-C is thought to be caused by an unusual biological response to infection in certain children
- Specialty: Paediatrics
- Symptoms: Fever, abdominal pain, diarrhea, vomiting, low blood pressure, insufficient blood supply (shock), pink eye, "strawberry tongue", rash, large lymph nodes, swollen hands or feet, neurological disturbances, among others
- Complications: Cardiac dysfunction; coronary artery abnormalities, including aneurysms; acute kidney injury; coagulopathy
- Usual onset: 2–6 weeks after COVID-19 exposure
- Causes: Severe acute respiratory syndrome coronavirus 2 (SARS-CoV-2)
- Diagnostic method: Clinical evaluation by specialists
- Differential diagnosis: Alternative infectious/non-infectious causes, Kawasaki disease
- Treatment: Intravenous immunoglobulin (IVIG); corticosteroids; oxygen; supportive care
- Prognosis: Generally good with treatment; long-term prognosis, unclear
- Frequency: Rare
- Deaths: <2% of reported cases

Multisystem inflammatory syndrome in children (MIS-C), or paediatric inflammatory multisystem syndrome (PIMS / PIMS-TS), or systemic inflammatory syndrome in COVID-19 (SISCoV), is a rare systemic illness involving persistent fever and extreme inflammation following exposure to SARS-CoV-2, the virus responsible for COVID-19. Studies have suggested that MIS-C occurred in 31.6 out of 100,000 people under 21 who were infected with COVID-19. It can rapidly lead to medical emergencies such as insufficient blood flow around the body (a condition known as shock). Failure of one or more organs can occur. A warning sign is unexplained persistent fever with severe symptoms following exposure to COVID-19. Prompt referral to paediatric specialists is essential, and families need to seek urgent medical assistance.

All affected children have persistent fever. Other clinical features vary. The first symptoms often include acute abdominal pain with diarrhea or vomiting. Muscle pain and general fatigue are frequent, and low blood pressure is also common. Symptoms can also include pink eye, rashes, enlarged lymph nodes, swollen hands and feet, and "strawberry tongue". Various mental disturbances are possible. A cytokine storm may take place, in which the child's innate immune system stages an excessive and uncontrolled inflammatory response. Heart failure is common. Clinical complications can include damage to the heart muscle, respiratory distress, acute kidney injury, and increased blood coagulation. Coronary artery abnormalities can develop (ranging from dilatation to aneurysms).

As of 2020, the disease proved fatal in under 2% of reported cases. Early recognition and prompt specialist attention are essential. Anti-inflammatory treatments have been used, with good responses being recorded for intravenous immunoglobulin (IVIG), with or without corticosteroids. Oxygen is often needed, and supportive care is key for treating clinical complications. Mortality is low for children who receive expert hospital care.

Knowledge of the syndrome evolved rapidly through the course of the COVID-19 pandemic (2020–2023). Its clinical features may appear somewhat similar to Kawasaki disease, a rare disease of unknown origin that typically affects young children, in which blood vessels become inflamed throughout the body.> It can also show features of other serious inflammatory conditions of childhood, including toxic shock and macrophage activation syndromes.

This emerging condition has been defined slightly differently (using different names), by the World Health Organization (WHO), the Royal College of Paediatrics and Child Health (RCPCH) in the UK, and the Centers for Disease Control and Prevention (CDC) in the US. Although the condition is thought to follow SARS-CoV-2 viral infection, antigen or antibody tests are not always positive. Exclusion of alternative causes, including bacterial and other infections, is essential for differential diagnosis. Some general clinical guidance has been provided by the RCPCH, the National Institutes of Health, the American College of Rheumatology, and the American Academy of Pediatrics.

Clusters of new cases have been reported two to six weeks after local peaks in viral transmission. The disease is thought to be driven by a delayed biological mechanism in certain predisposed children. In May 2020, the European Centre for Disease Prevention and Control (ECDC) rated risk to children in Europe as being "low" overall, based on a "very low" likelihood of a child developing this "high impact" disease. Regarding ethnicity, the condition seems to affect more children of African, Afro-Caribbean, and Hispanic descent, whereas Kawasaki disease affects more of East Asian ancestry. In adults, the condition is called multisystem inflammatory syndrome in adults (MIS-A) in the US.

As of August 2026, in the Anglosphere, only the United States and Australia continue to publish an ongoing tally of cases. At this date, the CDC reports a total number of cases of MIS as 9,808, with 80 deaths recorded in the United States (population c. 350 million. In Australia (population c. 28 million), there have been 217 confirmed cases in total, the number peaking in 2022. Vaccination against COVID-19 is cconsidered the best defence against developing PIMS.

== Name ==
The disorder has been called by various names, including:

- Multisystem inflammatory syndrome in children (MIS-C)
- Multisystem inflammatory syndrome (MIS) in children and adolescents temporally related to COVID-19
- Paediatric inflammatory multisystem syndrome (PIMS)
- Paediatric inflammatory multisystem syndrome, temporally associated with SARS-CoV-2 infection (PIMS-TS)
- Paediatric multisystem inflammatory syndrome (PMIS)
- Kawa-COVID-19
- Systemic inflammatory syndrome in COVID-19 (SISCoV)

== Background ==
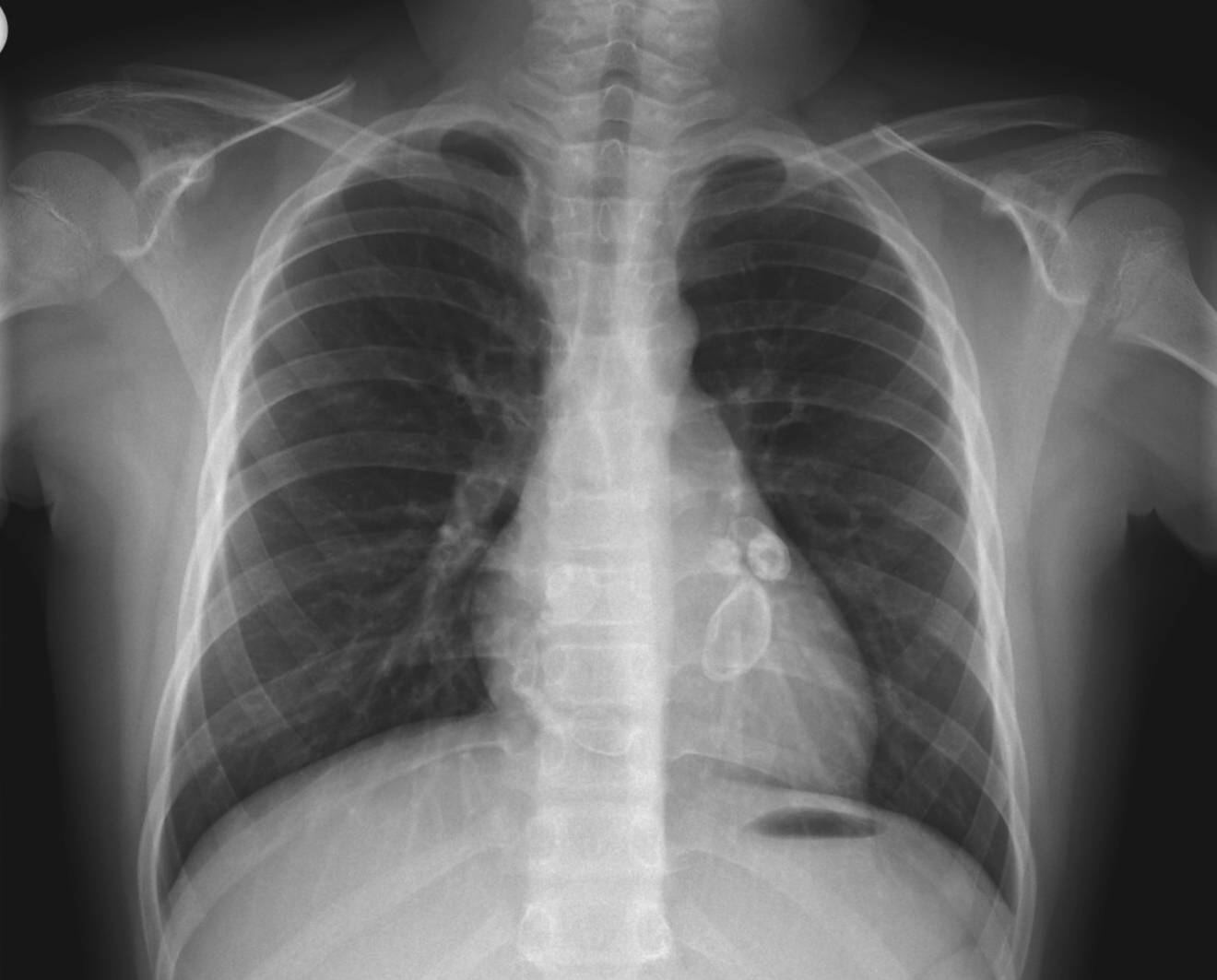
X-ray showing aneurysmal enlargement of the coronary arteries, which is a complication in a Kawasaki syndrome

Symptomatic cases of COVID-19 in children have been relatively uncommon, possibly because they generally experience milder disease. Early infection tends to be associated with mild or no symptoms, while the later pulmonary phase, which can be life-threatening in adults, is usually mild or absent. While cases of children with severe symptoms are exceptional, they can occasionally require intensive care. Fatalities have been rare.

In April 2020, a small group of children with evidence of SARS-CoV-2 infection or exposure to COVID-19 were found to display clinical features corresponding to the diagnostic criteria of Kawasaki disease, sometimes accompanied by shock. Kawasaki disease is a rare syndrome which mainly affects young children (adult onset has occasionally been reported). It is a form of vasculitis, where blood vessels become inflamed throughout the body, and it results in a persistent fever. Recovery typically occurs spontaneously, though some children later develop mid-sized or giant coronary artery aneurysms in the heart – a potentially fatal complication. Symptoms of toxic shock (a syndrome caused by bacterial toxins) occasionally occur – an association sometimes referred to as 'Kawasaki shock syndrome', which is characterised by systolic hypotension or signs of poor perfusion. While the exact cause of Kawasaki disease is unknown, one plausible explanation is that it may stem from an infection triggering an autoimmune and/or autoinflammatory response in children who are genetically predisposed. No specific diagnostic test exists for Kawasaki disease, and its recognition is based on various combinations of clinical and laboratory findings (including persistent fever, widespread rashes, enlarged lymph nodes, conjunctivitis, changes to the mucous membranes, and swollen hands and feet).

== Characteristics ==
MIS-C / PIMS-TS is a systemic disorder involving persistent fever, extreme inflammation (hyperinflammation), and organ dysfunction, which is temporally associated with exposure to COVID-19. Onset may be delayed or contemporary with ongoing SARS-CoV-2 infection, which may pass without symptoms. The time the syndrome takes to appear following the initial viral infection is debated, though it may develop between the first and second week. Epidemiological data suggest that recognition of the disease may typically be delayed by 2–6 weeks, and usually by 3–4 weeks. By the time of presentation, children have often developed antibodies to SARS-CoV-2, but test negative for the virus at RT-PCR.

The condition may match some or all of the diagnostic criteria for Kawasaki disease (i.e. the 'complete' or 'incomplete'/'atypical' subtypes), or for Kawasaki disease shock syndrome. It tends to affect all paediatric age groups, ranging from infancy to adolescence. It can also share clinical features with other paediatric inflammatory conditions, including toxic shock syndrome, and secondary haemophagocytic lymphohistiocytosis or macrophage activation syndrome. Coinfections with other pathogens have been recorded.

Affected children always present with persistent fever. Other clinical features at presentation vary. In contrast to acute COVID-19, most children have gastrointestinal symptoms, such as diarrhea, vomiting, and intense abdominal pain (sometimes severe enough to suggest appendicitis). Muscle pain and feelings of tiredness and general physical weakness are also very common. Some Kawasaki-like symptoms that may be present (especially in children under the age of 5) include mucosal changes around the mouth ("strawberry tongue", cracked lips, etc.), red eyes (conjunctivitis without pus), widespread rash (consistent with leukocytoclastic vasculitis), red or swollen hands and feet, and enlarged lymph nodes. Chest or neck pain may also be present. Severe headache and altered mental state have been reported, along with various neurological disturbances. Features of meningitis have been reported as well as septic encephalopathy, stroke, and Guillain-Barre Syndrome. Some patients present with very low blood pressure and shock, and they may require urgent admission to a paediatric intensive care unit.

Cardiovascular involvement is very frequent. Acute heart failure is common in the form of left ventricular dysfunction, and a left ventricular ejection fraction under 60% is frequent. Shock is often of myocardial – mainly left ventricular – origin. Respiratory symptoms are less common, and are not usually a prominent feature. When present, breathing difficulties are often linked to shock, and are suggestive of heart failure. Some children display features of a cytokine storm, including extremely high serum interleukin-6 (IL-6) levels, and need inotropic support to maintain cardiac output. Coronary artery abnormalities, such as dilatation, are frequent. Some children have developed coronary artery aneurysms. Electrocardiographic (ECG) abnormalities are common. Other cardiological features sometimes include inflammation of the heart valves (valvulitis) and of the fibrous sac surrounding the heart (pericarditis). Echocardiographic features of myocarditis (inflammation of the heart muscle) have been recorded.

Affected children consistently show laboratory evidence of hyperinflammation. Pronounced biological markers of inflammation generally include strongly raised erythrocyte sedimentation rate (ESR), C-reactive protein (CRP), procalcitonin, ferritin, and IL6. Low platelet counts and impaired blood clotting (coagulopathy) are also common, with increased levels of D-dimer and fibrinogen. Other haematological features include raised numbers of white blood cells (leukocytosis), characterised by high numbers of neutrophils, with many immature forms, and low numbers of lymphocytes (lymphopaenia). Numbers of red blood cells and platelets may be either normal or decreased. Acute kidney injury and low albumin levels in the blood (hypoalbuminaemia) are common. Low blood sodium levels and raised liver enzymes have been reported. Accumulations of fluid in the lungs (pleural effusion), around the heart (pericardial effusion), and in the abdomen (ascites) have also been reported, consistent with generalised inflammation.

Differences with respect to Kawasaki disease include frequent presentation with gastrointestinal symptoms such as vomiting, diarrhoea, and abdominal pain. Neurological involvement also appears to be relatively frequent. It often affects older children, whereas Kawasaki disease usually occurs before the age of five. Multiorgan disease appears to be more frequent. Myocarditis and cardiogenic shock seem to be relatively common. Myocarditis may be more evident in older children and adolescents. Preschool children tend to display more Kawasaki-like characteristics. Features of macrophage activation syndrome appear to be more frequent than in Kawasaki disease. Characteristic laboratory findings that are not usually encountered in Kawasaki disease include very high levels of ventricular natriuretic peptide (a marker of heart failure), as well as somewhat lower platelet counts, lower absolute lymphocyte counts, and higher CRP levels. Very high troponin levels (suggestive of myocardial damage) are also common.

=== Clinical course ===
Clinical course tends to be more severe than with Kawasaki disease. A child's condition can deteriorate rapidly, even in the presence of reassuring laboratory findings. Many children develop shock and heart failure. Most require paediatric intensive care. Supplemental oxygen is often needed, and mechanical ventilation is sometimes used. Most children who receive expert multidisciplinary care survive. In addition to respiratory distress, major complications that may need aggressive supportive care can include myocardial damage, acute kidney injury, and coagulopathy (thrombophilia). In some cases, sustained cardiac arrhythmias have led to haemodynamic collapse and need for extracorporeal membrane oxygenation (ECMO). Deaths have been recorded in a small minority (under 2%) of the cases reported. Occasionally, fatalities have followed complications of ECMO. Some children exposed to COVID-19 also appear to have a less severe Kawasaki-like disease. Ventricular function often recovers before discharge from hospital (often after 6–10 days). Coronary artery aneurysms can develop even in the absence of Kawasaki-like features. Their frequency and severity is uncertain. So far, they have been recorded in 7% of reported cases. Long-term prognosis is unclear.

== Diagnosis ==
Preliminary WHO case definition

Children and adolescents

- 0–19 years of age with fever >3 days

And

- Two of the following:
1. Rash or bilateral non-purulent conjunctivitis
  or muco-cutaneous inflammation signs
  (oral, hands or feet)
2. Hypotension or shock
3. Features of myocardial dysfunction, pericarditis,
  valvulitis, or coronary abnormalities
  (including ECHO findings or elevated Troponin/NT-proBNP)
4. Evidence of coagulopathy
  (by PT, PTT, elevated d-Dimers)
5. Acute gastrointestinal problems
  (diarrhoea, vomiting, or abdominal pain)

And

- Elevated markers of inflammation
  such as ESR, C-reactive protein, or procalcitonin

And

- No other obvious microbial cause of inflammation,
  including bacterial sepsis,
  staphylococcal or streptococcal shock syndromes

And

- Evidence of COVID-19
  (RT-PCR, antigen test or serology positive),
  or likely contact with patients with COVID-19

(Note: Consider this syndrome in children with features of
typical or atypical Kawasaki disease
or toxic shock syndrome.)

Diagnosis is by specialist clinical evaluation. Diagnostic suspicion may be raised by unexplained persistent fever and clinically concerning symptoms following exposure to COVID-19. Families need to seek immediate medical care, as the child's condition can deteriorate rapidly. Paediatricians' first involvement is often in the emergency department. Early recognition and multidisciplinary referral to paediatric specialists (in intensive care, infectious diseases, cardiology, haematology, rheumatology, etc.) is essential. Examinations may include blood tests, chest x-ray, heart ultrasound (echocardiography), and abdominal ultrasound. Clinicians worldwide have been urged to consider this condition in children who display some or all the features of Kawasaki disease or toxic shock syndrome.

=== Case definitions and guidance ===
A universally accepted case definition for this newly described syndrome has still not been agreed. In the meantime, different names and provisional case definitions are being used around the world. The initial case definitions released by the World Health Organization (WHO), the Royal College of Paediatrics and Child Health (RCPCH) and Centers for Disease Control and Prevention (CDC) all include involvement of more than one organ system, along with fever and elevated inflammatory markers. Criteria that vary among these three definitions include the ways in which involvement of different organs is defined, the duration of fever, and how exposure to COVID-19 is assessed.

- The preliminary WHO case definition is for "multisystem inflammatory syndrome (MIS) in children and adolescents temporally related to COVID-19" (box). The WHO has established a platform for standardised, anonymised clinical data, along with a dedicated case report form, and underlines the "urgent need for collection of standardised data describing clinical presentations, severity, outcomes, and epidemiology."
- Diagnostic guidance by the RCPCH proposes a broader case definition (for PIMS-TS), which was also endorsed by an expert panel convened by the American College of Cardiology. Key clinical criteria set out in the RCPHC case definition are: persistent fever, inflammation (indicated by neutrophilia, high CRP levels and low lymphocyte count), and evidence of organ dysfunction (shock; cardiac, respiratory, renal, gastrointestinal, or neurological disorder), coupled with additional clinical features, including laboratory, imaging and ECG findings. Coronary artery abnormalities, such as dilatation, may be apparent at echocardiography and ECG (or contrast CT of the chest). Biomarkers supporting the diagnosis include abnormal fibrinogen levels, high D-dimers (possible coagulopathy), high troponin, low albumin, and high ferritin. According to the RCPCH definition, the child may test positive or negative for SARS-CoV-2, but other possible microbial causes need to be excluded.
- The CDC case definition for MIS-C comprises individuals "aged <21 years presenting with fever, laboratory evidence of inflammation, and evidence of clinically severe illness requiring hospitalisation, with multisystem (>2) organ involvement (cardiac, renal, respiratory, hematologic, gastrointestinal, dermatologic or neurological)." It also requires that there should either be a positive antigen/antibody SARS-CoV-2 test or COVID-19 exposure in the 4 weeks before onset of symptoms, along with exclusion of other plausible diagnoses. This case definition is quite broad (it overlaps not only with Kawasaki disease, but also with juvenile rheumatoid arthritis, and various infectious/inflammatory conditions of childhood, including other viral diseases), but not as broad as the RCPCH definition. The CDC advises health providers in the United States to inform their public health authorities of suspected cases, even if they also meet full or partial criteria for Kawasaki disease, and to consider MIS-C after any childhood fatality in which there is evidence of SARS-CoV-2 infection.

Further case definitions have been formulated by the British Paediatric Surveillance Unit (BPSU) and the Canadian Paediatric Surveillance Program (CPSP). Some provisional diagnostic guidance has been provided by both the American College of Rheumatology and the American Academy of Pediatrics. In the UK, consensus has been reached for diagnostic investigation of children with suspected PIMS-TS. A clinical pathway for diagnostic evaluation of suspected MIS-C has also been proposed by the Children's Hospital of Philadelphia. A set of guidelines proposed by Western New York recommends also evaluating children with clinical features that overlap with the MIS-C case definition, but who have been screened with mild illness and laboratory abnormalities, and who do not have an alternative diagnosis.

=== Differential diagnosis ===
It is essential to exclude alternative non-infectious and infectious causes of the inflammatory condition, including bacterial sepsis, staphylococcal and streptococcal shock, and infections associated with myocarditis, such as enterovirus. (Coinfection with additional pathogens, including human metapneumovirus and various other microbes, may sometimes occur.) Other potentially unrelated sources of abdominal pain include appendicitis and mesenteric adenitis.

Differential diagnosis with Kawasaki disease can be challenging, given the lack of a diagnostic test for either condition. It was not known whether the newly described condition is superimposable with Kawasaki disease shock syndrome. Since prompt diagnosis and timely treatment of actual Kawasaki disease is important to prevent complications, a call has been made to "Keep a high suspicion for Kawasaki disease in all children with prolonged fever, but especially in those younger than 1 year of age."

== Treatment ==
Due to the limited information available on this rare new diagnosis, clinical management has been largely based on expert opinion, including knowledge acquired from treating Kawasaki disease and other systemic inflammatory disorders of childhood, in addition to experience with COVID-19 in adults. Treatment is tailored for each individual child, with input from the various consulting specialists. Approaches vary. The RCPCH initially outlined a provisional approach to clinical management, including guidance on early medical management, monitoring and some general principles of treatment; for the UK, consensus has since been reached regarding a recommended pathway for clinical management (including access to registered clinical trials). The National Institutes of Health provides some general considerations. The American College of Rheumatology provides guidance for clinical management of MIS-C. The American Academy of Pediatrics has also provided some interim guidance. Other proposals have also been made. RCPCH guidance recommends that all affected children should be treated as having suspected COVID-19.

Little specific information is available regarding therapeutic effectiveness. Most children who have been treated as for Kawasaki disease have recovered. Supportive care is a mainstay of therapy, and for mild or moderate disease it may be sufficient. Major complications may respond well to more aggressive supportive care. Cardiac and respiratory support may benefit children who present predominantly with shock.

Strategies for clinical management tend to be broadly based on anti-inflammatory medications, treatment of shock, and prevention of thrombosis. Most children have received immunomodulatory treatment with intravenous immunoglobulin (IVIG). IVIG has been reported target IL-1β+ neutrophils and their activation in the affected children. Other anti-inflammatory treatments have been used, including corticosteroids at various doses. Good responses have been recorded for IVIG, with or without corticosteroids. Cases requiring steroids due to resistance to IVIG may be more common than in Kawasaki disease. In a minority of cases, cytokine blockers have been used as a supplemental therapy to inhibit production of IL-6 (tocilizumab) or IL-1 (anakinra); TNF-α-inhibitors (infliximab) have also been used. Inotropic or vasoactive agents are often used for children with cardiac dysfunction and hypotension. Anticoagulants have been used. Low-dose aspirin has been used as an antiplatelet drug.

Treatment strategies are being considered to prevent serious long-term complications such as coronary artery aneurysms (the main complication of Kawasaki disease). Close outpatient follow-up by a paediatric cardiology team has been recommended.

== Causes ==
While it has been hypothesised that the condition is related to COVID-19, it has also been emphasised that the potential link "is neither established nor well understood." A temporal association between SARS-CoV-2 infection and clinical presentation of the syndrome is plausible. A causality assessment found that 'temporality' was among the five (out of nine) Bradford Hill criteria that supported a causal relationship between SARS-CoV-2 infection and the development of the syndrome. Further characterisation of the syndrome is essential to identify risk factors and help understand causality. It is unclear to what extent this emerging syndrome has a similar aetiology to Kawasaki disease (a condition predating the emergence of SARS-CoV-2, which is currently thought to be triggered by a distinct viral agent). Although some cases resemble toxic shock syndrome, there is no evidence that staphylococcal or streptococcal toxins are involved. The role of comorbidities is unclear. Improved understanding will have potential implications for clinical management. Genome-wide association studies are expected to provide insights on susceptibility and potential biological mechanisms.

== Mechanism ==
The pathogenesis is not completely known and could implicate several factors. SARS-CoV-2 could have one of several roles; it could act as an environmental trigger for the condition either directly or indirectly (by somehow paving the way for a different trigger).

As with Kawasaki disease, antibody-dependent enhancement, whereby development of antibodies could facilitate viral entry into host cells, has been proposed as a potential mechanism. Epidemiological considerations make a post-infectious mechanism seem likely, possibly coinciding with the development of acquired immune responses to the virus. It has been suggested that the condition may be caused by the cytokine storms induced by COVID-19. The characteristic ability of coronaviruses to block type I and type III interferon responses could help explain a delayed cytokine storm in children whose immune systems struggle to control SARS-CoV-2 viral replication, or are overwhelmed by a high initial viral load. One plausible chain of events leading up to a hyperimmune response could involve early viral triggering of macrophage activation, followed by T helper cell stimulation, in turn leading to cytokine release, stimulation of macrophages, neutrophils, and monocytes, in conjunction with B cell and plasma cell activation, and autoantibody production.

It is unknown to what extent the pathophysiology resembles that of other paediatric inflammatory syndromes that share similar clinical features. Clinical overlaps with syndromes that have different causes (Kawasaki disease, toxic shock, macrophage activation syndrome, and secondary haemophagocytic lymphohistiocytosis) may be explained by immunological activation and dysregulation of similar inflammatory pathways. In each of these syndromes, a cytokine storm leads to failure of multiple organs. They also share with MIS-C and severe cases of COVID-19 high levels both of ferritin (released by neutrophils) and of haemophagocytosis.

The frequent gastrointestinal presentation and mesenteric lymph node inflammation are in keeping with the known liking of SARS-CoV-2 to replicate in enterocytes. Association of Kawasaki-like disease with COVID-19 could support the view that SARS-CoV-2 can cause systemic vasculitis by targeting endothelial tissue via angiotensin-converting enzyme 2 (ACE2), the protein which the virus uses to gain access to cells. While the initial infection is known to be capable of causing acute myocardial damage, occurrence of myocarditis could also plausibly be linked to systemic hyperinflammation triggered by a disorderly post-infectious immune response. It has been suggested that SARS-CoV-2 might lead to immune-mediated damage to the heart and coronary arteries via immune complexes or increased T-cell responses.

Understanding the pathophysiology is a key research priority. Questions regarding the underlying molecular mechanisms that lead to the disorder following exposure to SARS-CoV-2 include identification of: any genetic predisposition factors; any associations with particular viral variant/s; any molecular patterns capable of triggering the autoimmune/autoinflammatory responses. Another key question is whether the molecular mechanisms that trigger autoimmune/autoinflammatory responses in children with PMIS and adults with severe COVID-19 (including the induction of high concentrations of IL-6) are similar or distinct.

A potential link with Kawasaki disease was discussed in a July 2020 study. It has been noted that a leading hypothesis for the pathogenesis of Kawasaki disease also involves a hyperinflammatory response to viral infection (such as by a novel RNA virus) in some genetically predisposed children, and that SARS-CoV-2 is now "added to the list" of implicated viral triggers. The authors of a January 2023 study in Austria that compared 395 PIMS and 69 KD hospitalised patients concluded: "Despite differences in age distribution and disease severity, PIMS and KD cases shared many common clinical and prognostic characteristics. This supports the hypothesis that the two entities represent a syndrome continuum".

=== Proposed role of the STING pathway ===
A possible role of the stimulator of interferon genes known as STING was proposed in 2021. SARS-CoV-2 is capable of upregulating the STING protein (encoded by TMEM173 transmembrane protein, and expressed in alveoli, endothelial cells, and the spleen), resulting in massive release of interferon-beta and cytokines derived from activation of NF-κB and IRF-3. In MIS-C, such a scenario could lead to a clinical picture similar to STING-associated vasculopathy with onset in infancy (also known as SAVI) – a condition characterised by fever, lung injury, vascular inflammation, myositis, skin lesions (occasionally acral necrosis), and arterial aneurysms. Variations in the presentation and severity of MIS-C might at least partially be explained by characteristic differences in polymorphisms of TMEM173 found in various populations.

=== Potential role of TGFβ and Epstein-Barr Virus ===
A study suggests that the suppression of T cell surveillance of latent viruses, especially Epstein-Barr virus (EBV), through the cytokine TGFβ, is a potential contributor to the pathogenesis of MIS-C. The study demonstrated that TCRVβ21.3-expressing T cells expanded in MIS-C are reactive against EBV but possess reduced cytotoxicity and are unable to effectively eliminate EBV-infected B cells. This suppression was dependent on the cytokine TGFβ and led to EBV reactivation in MIS-C patients. The study further revealed that approximately 80% of children with MIS-C had antibodies against EBV, compared to about 50% of age-matched children who had experienced a SARS-CoV-2 infection but did not develop MIS-C 4–6 weeks later. This suggests that prior EBV infection may increase the risk of developing MIS-C.

== Epidemiology ==
Epidemiological information is limited, and clinical statistics currently derive from review of case series. (Note: Given that hospital case series can be selected on the basis of clinical factors such as presence of heart failure or admission to intensive care units, available statistical information regarding the frequencies of different clinical features may be skewed by selection bias.) This emerging condition is considered rare. Studies suggest that MIS-C occurred in 31.6 out of 100,000 people under 21 who were infected with COVID-19.

Based on available reports in 2020, the fatality rate among diagnosed cases appears to have been about 1.7% (notably higher than the rate of 0.07% recorded among children with Kawasaki disease in Japan). A rapid risk assessment conducted by the European Centre for Disease Prevention and Control (ECDC) concluded that the overall risk to children in the European Union (EU), European Economic Area (EEA) and the UK "is considered 'low', based on a 'very low' probability of [the disease] in children and a 'high' impact of such disease."

Clusters of cases of the newly described condition have been recorded 3–4 weeks after peaks in SARS-CoV-2 viral transmission through various local communities. (Note: A nationwide surveillance programme in France, set up to investigate the temporal relationship between SARS-CoV-2 infection and PMIS, revealed that 95 of the 156 cases of Kawasaki-like disease notified between 1 March and 17 May 2020 were "confirmed or probable post-COVID-19 cases", with a peak in incidence 4–5 weeks after the peak of the COVID-19 epidemic in the country. Clinicians in Bergamo, Italy, reported an apparent (not seasonally adjusted) 30-fold increase in the incidence of Kawasaki-like disease during the first six weeks after the arrival there of SARS-CoV-2 virus infection, at a time when Bergamo was experiencing the highest rates of infections and deaths in Italy. In the UK, the number of intensive care admissions for children fulfilling the RCPCH case definition of PMIS during 40 days through April and early May, following the first national surge in COVID-19 cases, was at least 11-fold higher than historical trends for paediatric inflammatory conditions. Time series analysis of cases of Kawasaki disease admitted to a paediatric centre in Paris, France, revealed a spike that started 2 weeks after the first peak of the COVID-19 epidemic there, corresponding to a roughly 5-fold increase in incidence. These cases from Paris had a similarly severe clinical profile to those reported in Bergamo (and differed from the more typical Kawasaki disease profile observed in a newly uncovered spike following the peak of the 2009 H1N1 swine flu epidemic in Paris).) Such observations have been seen to support the concept that SARS-CoV-2 infection may be capable of triggering a severe form of a Kawasaki-like disease. Frequent presentation without prominent respiratory symptoms in children who do not appear to have ongoing SARS-CoV-2 infection but who have already developed antibodies suggests that the disease may be driven by a delayed, post-infectious mechanism.

The median age of onset appears to be at least 7 years (compared with 2 years for Kawasaki disease, which primarily affects children under the age of 5). Male children seem to be more frequently affected (broadly in line with Kawasaki disease, where the male to female ratio is about 1.5 to 1). Many affected children appear not to have underlying health conditions, such as asthma or autoimmune disorders, and there have been relatively few reports of known congenital heart disease or preexisting cardiovascular disease. Over half (52%) the children with available information had no recorded underlying health condition, including being overweight or obese (among those who did have some comorbidity, 51% were either overweight or obese).

Regarding ethnicity, reports from France and the UK raised the possibility that children of Afro-Caribbean descent may be at greater risk, plausibly due to a genetic predisposition. In the US (as of mid-July), the majority of cases were classified as Hispanic/Latino (38%) or non-Hispanic Black (33%) people. Based on reports confined to Europe and the US, the condition seems to affect more children of African, Afro-Caribbean, and Hispanic descent, whereas Kawasaki disease affects more of East Asian and Pacific Islander ancestry. The role of socioeconomic and other environmental factors in such discrepancies is unclear. One study suggested that rates of children with COVID-19 who do not get MIS-C may be underrepresented in some communities and lack diversity, making it difficult to determine the rates of MIS-C among children who were infected with COVID-19 in these communities.

As regards geographical distribution, there has been uncertainty as to whether the initial reports of cases in Europe and North America reflected a true pattern, or whether the condition had gone unrecognised elsewhere. In Japan and other Southeast and East Asian countries where Kawasaki disease is usually much more prevalent than in Europe, no case of Kawasaki-like disease linked to COVID-19 had been reported during the first wave of transmission. (Note: No apparent rise in new cases of Kawasaki disease was noted in these countries, including in South Korea (where one diagnosis was subsequently reclassified as MIS-C), and in Singapore. There had been no report of Kawasaki disease or Kawasaki-like symptoms in mainland China.) Reports of confirmed or suspected cases have since emerged in many different countries around the world. (Note: An extensive Latin-American Kawasaki disease surveillance network (REKAM-LATINA) has recorded cases of MIS-C across all its participating countries. Some other countries where cases have been reported include Russia, India, Pakistan, Kazakhstan, South Korea, Turkey, Iran, Saudi Arabia, Israel, Algeria, South Africa, and Australia.)

None of the three main provisional case-definitions of the emerging entity is diagnostically specific. Concerns have been raised regarding the potential for missed or delayed diagnosis of Kawasaki disease due to heightened diagnostic suspicion for the new entity. Misclassification of cases of Kawasaki disease and of other inflammatory and infectious diseases of childhood whose case definitions overlap with MIS-C could skew understanding of the new entity, such as the frequency of coronary artery aneurysms. Another concern is that clinically less severe cases of the new entity may be missed, and that the actual spectrum of disease severity could be broader, especially given the reliance on early observations of severe disease for provisional case definition. Some statistical modeling has been used to explore possible subdivision of cases satisfying the CDC's case definition into three distinct subgroups based on underlying clinical similarities: Class 1, characterised by pronounced multiorgan involvement, with little overlap with Kawasaki disease or acute COVID-19; Class 2, more predominantly characterised by respiratory symptoms typical of acute COVID-19; Class 3, a clinically less severe grouping, where rashes and mucosal symptoms are prevalent, with less multiorgan involvement, and generally greater overlap with Kawasaki disease. A suggestion that research into the biology of the disease might benefit from considering cases of Kawasaki disease and of the provisionally defined entity in conjunction is debated.

An October 2022 systematic review reported, "Severe MIS-C increases the risk of hospitalisation and is the most common cause of death among children with COVID-19", and concluded that vaccination was the safest way of reducing the prevalence of COVID-19 among children.

=== In adults ===
Formerly, there was uncertainty as to whether the condition was confined to children, and there was debate over whether adults experienced the same condition. As of 2025, the CDC recognises MIS-A as a condition affecting adults. MIS-C is more common than MIS-A.

=== Prevalence: 2026 ===
As of August 2026, the CDC reports a total number of cases meeting the definition of MIS as 9,808, with 80 deaths recorded in the United States. In Australia, there have been 217 cases classified as confirmed, probable or possible PIMS-TS, the number peaking in 2022. Around 60% of these were boys, and the majority were 5–12-year-olds. The youngest was six months, and the oldest 16 years. Aboriginal or Torres Strait Islanders were overrepresented in the statistics,at 5.5%. Canada and the UK do not publish ongoing statistics.

== Effect of vaccination ==
MIS-C has also been monitored as a potential paediatric adverse event following COVID-19 vaccination. Research suggests that COVID-19 vaccination lowers the risk of MIS-C, and in cases where symptoms develop after vaccine, is likely extremely rare or related to factors like recent exposure to COVID-19.

As of June 2022, "preliminary data from the US Centers for Disease Control indicates that two doses of the Pfizer COVID vaccine can protect children against developing multisystem inflammatory syndrome after COVID infection (roughly 80% protective in children aged 5-11 years and about 90% protective in adolescents 12-18 years old)". A small study (15 patients) in April 2022 concluded that there was no risk to patients who had recovered from MIS-C receiving the COVID-19 vaccine, the authors suggesting that it "could lower their risk for developing another case of COVID-19 without increasing their risk for re-occurrence of MIS-C or serious inflammation".

== History ==
Cases of Kawasaki disease with concurrent SARS-CoV-2 infection have been recorded among children in Europe and in the United States since 7 April 2020, when a report was published by the American Academy of Pediatrics regarding a case of 'classic' Kawasaki disease in a six-month old girl who tested positive for COVID-19 in California. In this case, COVID-19 did not appear to have significant clinical implications.

On 25 April, concerns were initially raised in the United Kingdom regarding a cluster of children of various ages presenting with a multisystem inflammatory state who required intensive care, and who all displayed "overlapping features of toxic shock syndrome and atypical Kawasaki disease with blood parameters consistent with severe COVID-19 in children." Details of the eight cases which helped trigger this alert (not all with confirmed exposure to COVID-19) were later reported in The Lancet, where the authors summarised the clinical picture as "a hyperinflammatory syndrome with multiorgan involvement similar to Kawasaki disease shock syndrome." Accounts of analogous cases – including some that appeared less clinically severe – were also being informally shared among clinicians around Europe. The EU's Early Warning and Response System flagged suspected cases in Austria, Germany and Portugal that had tested positive for SARS-CoV-2. In Bergamo, at the heart of the COVID-19 epidemic in Lombardy, a cluster of 20 cases of Kawasaki disease appeared to be roughly equivalent to the number commonly recorded there over the course of three years. In France, the government reported on 29 April that around 15 children were in hospital in Paris with symptoms of Kawasaki disease, an observation which prompted the organisation of national surveillance programme for recent cases of Kawasaki-like disease.

On 1 May, the RCPCH published a preliminary case definition based on review of the characteristics of the cases identified in the UK, accompanied by some clinical guidance. Two weeks later, on 15 May, two further preliminary case definitions were published separately by the WHO and by the CDC, while the ECDC released a 'rapid risk assessment' of the condition on behalf of the European Union. In the following weeks, further clinical guidance was released by other medical organisations, including the NIH, the American College of Rheumatology, and the American Academy of Pediatrics. On 4 May, the New York City Department of Health and Mental Hygiene issued an alert to identify children with the condition in New York City hospitals, where 15 such cases were already being treated. On 9 May, the governor of New York, Andrew Cuomo announced a collaboration with the CDC to help develop national criteria for identifying and responding to the newly identified childhood disease.

By 12 May, some 230 suspected cases had been reported across the EU and EEA, and in the UK (in the following days, sources were reporting up to 100 in the UK, over 135 in France, 20 in the Netherlands, 10 in Switzerland and 10 in Germany). In the United States, more than 200 cases were suspected by mid-May, including some 145 in New York; 186 confirmed cases were eventually diagnosed between 15 March and 20 May in 26 US states. As of 11 May 2020, five fatalities were reported (1 in France, 1 in the UK, 3 in the US). In peer-reviewed medical journals, case series and related studies of the new condition were rapidly reported from countries including the UK; Italy; Spain; France and Switzerland; France; and across the US, including New York. The emerging observations suggested somewhat greater variety in the severity of symptoms than was originally thought. The proposal of a new clinical entity during a pandemic also prompted scientific discussion about its possible distinction from Kawasaki disease, and the potential role of COVID-19.

By 15 July 342 confirmed MIS-C cases (including 6 deaths) had been recorded in the US across 36 states plus Washington DC. Most (71%) of the children were Hispanic/Latino or non-Hispanic Black people, and the CDC underlined the need to learn the reasons for such a preponderance. By 29 July, a total of 570 cases and 10 deaths had been reported across 40 states, Washington DC, and New York City.

Until late May, no confirmed case had been documented outside the EU/EEA/UK and USA. No suspicious case had been observed in East Asia or Southeast Asia (or in Australia or New Zealand). The absence of documented cases in China and other Asian countries that had already experienced a COVID-19 epidemic led to conjectures regarding the possibility of a significant evolution of the virus, or variations in susceptibility in different populations. On 2 June, news emerged of a first case of MIS-C diagnosed in Peru. In Brazil, cases of MIS-C have been reported in São Paulo, and in the context of a prospective study in Pará; more children with severe late manifestations of COVID-19 were being admitted to paediatric intensive care units in the region. In Chile, 42 confirmed cases of MIS-C had been recorded nationally by 28 June, including 27 in the capital, Santiago. In Russia, 13 children had been treated (5 with intensive care) by mid-June for a multisystem inflammatory syndrome at the Morozov Children's Hospital in Moscow, including a 2-year-old girl with the COVID-19 infection who died on 23 May following an initial diagnosis of suspected Kawasaki disease. In Iran, a case report (first submitted in May) described severe MIS-C in a 5-year-old girl who had presented with shock and was initially diagnosed with Kawasaki disease, and further cases of the new syndrome have been recorded. In India, a case of suspected MIS-C was reported in late May regarding a child who had presented in a COVID-19 hotspot in Kerala. An editorial commentary urged clinicians to have a high level of diagnostic suspicion and follow WHO and CDC definitions to facilitate timely identification and treatment of cases.

During July, suspected cases were being flagged and reported in Mumbai, in Delhi, Chennai, and elsewhere. In Pakistan, at least 24 children were said to have Kawasaki-like symptoms in Lahore, where 8 cases fulfilling WHO criteria were prospectively identified by 30 June. In Kazakhstan, 14 cases were confirmed by 20 August (among 2,357 children known to have been infected). Cases have been recorded in Israel, including one of a child who presented with severe central nervous system involvement and complement deficiency. In Turkey, four children with a Kawasaki-like disease probably associated with COVID-19 are reported to have been admitted to the children's hospital of Hacettepe University in Ankara between 13 April and 11 July. In Algeria, a first case was recorded in June. In Egypt, on 10 July the authorities denied rumours of the existence of cases of Kawasaki-like disease in the country. In South Africa, the first 23 affected children were treated in Cape Town – the initial epicentre of the national COVID-19 epidemic – between 4 June and 24 July. In Ecuador, the Ministry of Health announced on 19 July the presence of 46 probable cases. In Costa Rica, a national public health organisation announced towards the end of August that three children had been diagnosed with MIS-C. Cases of MIS-C had also been recorded in many other Latin American countries, including Argentina, Bolivia, Colombia, Cuba, the Dominican Republic, El Salvador, Guatemala, Honduras, Mexico, Nicaragua, Panama, Uruguay, and Venezuela, as well as in Puerto Rico. News of a first confirmed case of PIMS-TS in Australia emerged (from Victoria) on 4 September, along with news of other suspected cases under review. In South Korea, news of two confirmed cases broke on 5 October (and the existence of a case dating back to the end of April was reported in November).

A similar condition began to be recognised in some adults. In June, an adult case of a Kawasaki-like multisystem inflammatory syndrome following SARS-CoV-2 infection was described in a 54-year-old woman from Israel with no history of autoimmune disease, who experienced uveitis in both eyes. (A further suspected adult case was covered in the Israeli national press.) A case involving a 36-year-old Hispanic American woman with clinical features otherwise consistent with MIS-C was reported from New York. A diagnosis consistent with PMIS was also reported in a UK-born, 21-year-old man of Somali origin. A case report published in The Lancet regarding a 45-year-old Hispanic man who presented in New York with features strongly resembling MIS-C called for awareness of "a potential MIS-C-like condition in adults." Further reports of multisystem inflammatory syndrome linked to COVID-19 exposure emerged in adults. In October, the CDC reported on the condition and named it 'multisystem inflammatory syndrome in adults' (MIS-A). Questions have been raised regarding possible relationships between MIS-C and certain severe manifestations of COVID-19 in adults.

Children's neurological symptoms, as studied in London in mid-2020, often involved "both the central and peripheral nervous systems," according to a report by the American Academy of Neurology released on 13 April 2021.
