= Bubonic plague =

Human and animal disease

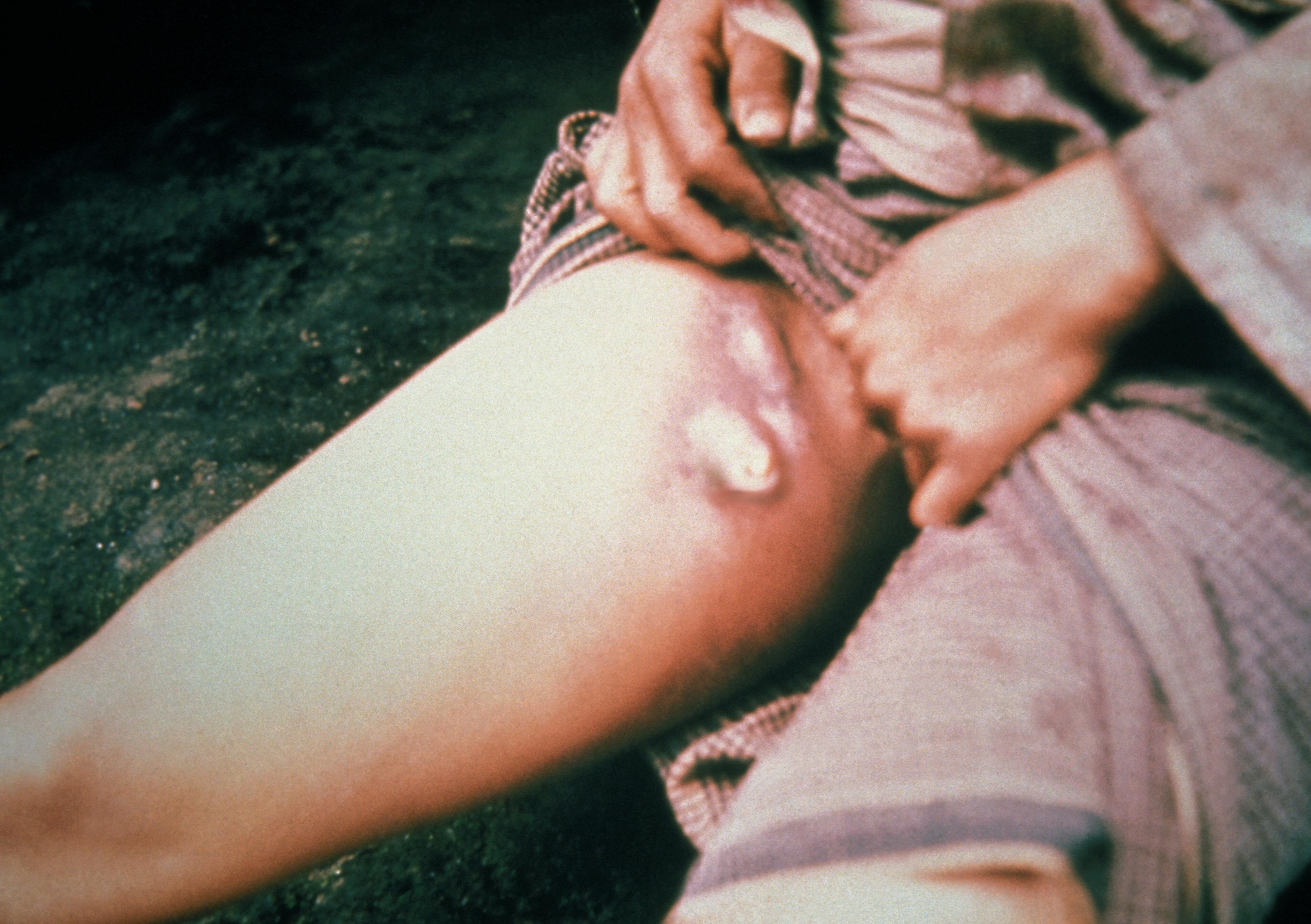
- A bubo on the upper thigh of a person infected with bubonic plague
- Specialty: Infectious disease
- Symptoms: Fever, headaches, vomiting, swollen lymph nodes
- Complications: Gangrene, meningitis
- Usual onset: 1–7 days after exposure
- Causes: Yersinia pestis spread by fleas
- Diagnostic method: Finding the bacterium in the blood, sputum, or lymph nodes
- Treatment: Antibiotics such as streptomycin, gentamicin, or doxycycline
- Frequency: 783 cases are reported yearly (WHO 2013)
- Deaths: 10% mortality with treatment 30–90% if untreated

Bubonic plague is one of three types of plague caused by the bacterium Yersinia pestis. One to seven days after exposure to the bacteria, flu-like symptoms develop. These symptoms include fever, headaches, and vomiting, as well as swollen and painful lymph nodes occurring in the area closest to where the bacteria entered the skin. Acral necrosis, the dark discoloration of skin, is another symptom. Occasionally, swollen lymph nodes, known as "buboes", may break open.

The three types of plague are the result of the route of infection: bubonic plague, septicemic plague, and pneumonic plague. Bubonic plague is mainly spread by infected fleas from small animals. It may also result from exposure to the body fluids from a dead plague-infected animal. Mammals such as rabbits, hares, and some cat species are susceptible to bubonic plague, and typically die upon contraction. In the bubonic form of plague, the bacteria enter through the skin through a flea bite and travel via the lymphatic vessels to a lymph node, causing it to swell. Diagnosis is made by finding the bacteria in the blood, sputum, or fluid from lymph nodes.

Prevention is through public health measures such as not handling dead animals in areas where plague is common. While vaccines against the plague have been developed, the World Health Organization recommends that only high-risk groups, such as certain laboratory personnel and health care workers, get inoculated. Several antibiotics are effective for treatment, including streptomycin, gentamicin, and doxycycline.

Without treatment, plague results in the death of 30% to 90% of those infected. Death, if it occurs, is typically within 10 days. With treatment, the risk of death is around 10%. Globally between 2010 and 2015 there were 3,248 documented cases, which resulted in 584 deaths. The countries with the greatest number of cases are the Democratic Republic of the Congo, Madagascar, and Peru.

The plague is considered the likely cause of the Black Death that swept through Asia, Europe, and Africa in the 14th century and killed an estimated 50 million people, including about 25% to 60% of the European population. Because the plague killed so many of the working population, wages rose due to the demand for labor. Some historians see this as a turning point in European economic development. The disease is also considered to have been responsible for the Plague of Justinian, originating in the Eastern Roman Empire in the 6th century CE, as well as the third epidemic, affecting China, Mongolia, and India, originating in the Yunnan Province in 1855. The term bubonic is derived from the Greek word βουβών, meaning 'groin'.

== Cause ==
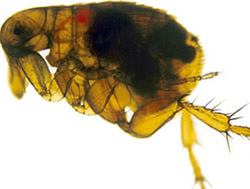
An Oriental rat flea (Xenopsylla cheopis) infected with the plague bacterium (Yersinia pestis), which appears as a dark mass in the gut. The foregut of this flea is blocked by a Y. pestis biofilm; when the flea attempts to feed on an uninfected host, Y. pestis from the foregut is regurgitated into the wound, transmitting the bacteria and initiating infection.

The bubonic plague is an infection of the lymphatic system, usually resulting from the bite of an infected flea, Xenopsylla cheopis (the Oriental rat flea), though other flea species are able to carry the bubonic plague, such as Pulex irritans (the human flea) and Ceratophyllus fasciatus. Xenopsylla cheopis was the most effective flea species for transmission.

The flea is parasitic on house and field rats and seeks out other hosts when its rodent host dies. Rats were an amplifying factor to bubonic plague due to their common association with humans (living around and within dwellings) as well as the nature of their blood, which allows the rat to withstand a major concentration of the plague. The bacteria form aggregates in the gut of infected fleas, and this results in the flea regurgitating ingested blood, which is now infected, into the bite site of a rodent or human host. Once established, the bacteria rapidly spread to the lymph nodes of the host and multiply. The fleas that transmit the disease only directly infect humans when the rat population in the area is wiped out from a mass infection. Furthermore, in areas with a large population of rats, individual rats can harbor low levels (subclinical) of the plague infection without causing human outbreaks. With no new rat inputs being added to the population from other areas, the infection only spread to humans in very rare cases of overcrowding.

== Signs and symptoms ==
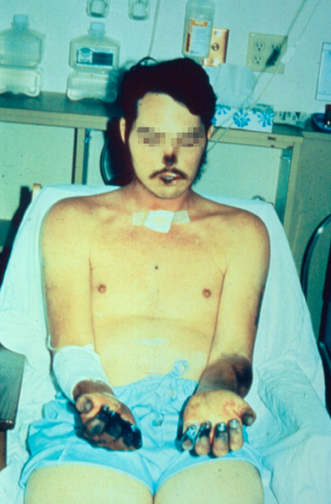
Necrosis of the nose, the lips, and the fingers and residual bruising over both forearms in a person recovering from bubonic plague that disseminated to the blood and the lungs. At one time, the person's entire body was bruised.

After being transmitted via the bite of an infected flea, the Y. pestis bacteria become localized in an inflamed lymph node, where they begin to colonize and reproduce. Infected lymph nodes develop hemorrhages, which result in the death of tissue. Y. pestis bacilli can resist phagocytosis and even reproduce inside phagocytes and kill them. As the disease progresses, the lymph nodes can hemorrhage and become swollen and necrotic. Bubonic plague can progress to lethal septicemic plague in some cases. The plague is also known to spread to the lungs and become the disease known as the pneumonic plague. Symptoms appear two to seven days after getting bitten and they include:

- Chills
- General ill feeling (malaise)
- High fever >39 °C (102.2 °F)
- Muscle cramps
- Seizures
- Smooth, painful lymph gland swelling called a bubo, commonly found in the groin, but may occur in the armpits or neck, most often near the site of the initial infection (bite or scratch)
- Pain may occur in the area before the swelling appears
- Gangrene of the extremities such as toes, fingers, lips, and tip of the nose.

The best-known symptom of bubonic plague is one or more infected, enlarged, and painful lymph nodes, known as buboes. Buboes associated with the bubonic plague are commonly found in the armpits, upper femoral area, groin, and neck region. These buboes will grow and become more painful over time, often to the point of bursting. Symptoms include heavy breathing, continuous vomiting of blood (hematemesis), aching limbs, coughing, and extreme pain caused by the decay or decomposition of the skin while the person is still alive. Additional symptoms include extreme fatigue, gastrointestinal problems, spleen inflammation, lenticulae (black dots scattered throughout the body), delirium, coma, organ failure, and death. Organ failure is a result of the bacteria infecting organs through the bloodstream. Other forms of the disease include septicemic plague and pneumonic plague, in which the bacterium reproduces in the person's blood and lungs respectively.

== Diagnosis ==
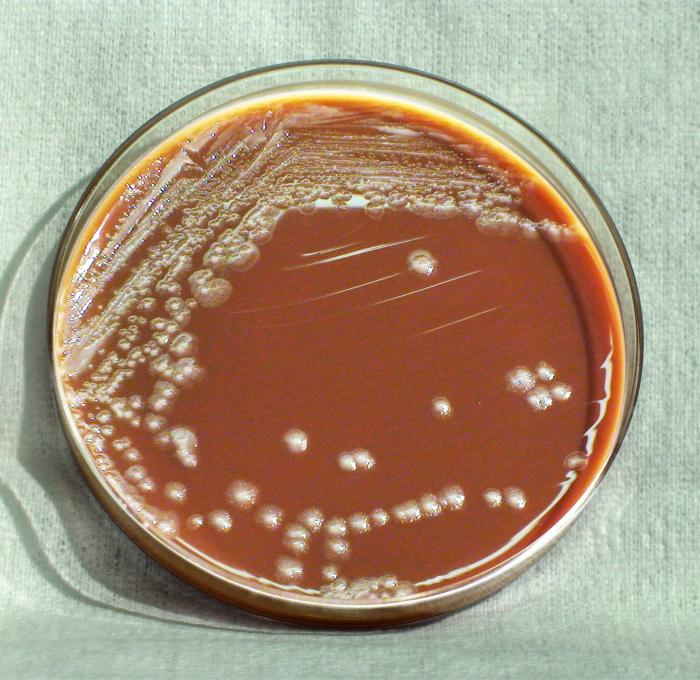
Gram-negative Yersinia pestis bacteria. The culture was grown over a 72-hour time period.

Laboratory testing is required in order to diagnose and confirm plague. Ideally, confirmation is through the identification of Y. pestis culture from a patient sample. Confirmation of infection can be done by examining serum taken during the early and late stages of infection. To quickly screen for the Y. pestis antigen in patients, rapid dipstick tests have been developed for field use.

Samples taken for testing include:

- Buboes: Swollen lymph nodes (buboes) characteristic of bubonic plague, a fluid sample can be taken from them with a needle.
- Blood: blood cultures test blood samples for bacteria to find source of infection
- Lungs: Spirometry test are used to screen the lungs for diseases that affect the airways. Chest X-rays of the lungs are also used as an effective method of diagnosis.

== Prevention ==
Bubonic plague outbreaks are controlled by pest control and modern sanitation techniques. This disease uses fleas commonly found on rats as a vector to jump from animals to humans. The mortality rate is highest in the summer and early fall. The successful control of rat populations in dense urban areas is essential to outbreak prevention. One example is the use of a machine called the Sulfurozador, used to deliver sulphur dioxide to eradicate the pest that spread the bubonic plague in Buenos Aires, Argentina during the early 18th century. Targeted chemoprophylaxis, sanitation, and vector control also played a role in controlling the 2003 Oran outbreak of the bubonic plague. Another means of prevention in large European cities was a city-wide quarantine to not only limit interaction with people who were infected, but also to limit the interaction with the infected rats.

== Treatment ==
Before the development of effective antimicrobial drugs, attempts to combat bubonic plague included vaccination and serum therapy. In 1896, Alexandre Yersin developed an antiplague serum derived from immunized horses, intended to provide antibodies to patients already infected with plague. The treatment's effectiveness was inconsistent. In 1897, Russian-born bacteriologist Waldemar Haffkine developed a preventive plague vaccine using heat-killed bacteria.

During the 1900–1904 San Francisco plague, public health authorities distributed Haffkine's prophylactic vaccine and Yersin's antiplague serum. In May 1900, San Francisco officials attempted to require Chinese and Japanese residents to receive the Haffkine vaccine, a discriminatory policy challenged in Wong Wai v. Williamson. Unlike Yersin's serum, Haffkine's vaccine was not intended to treat patients who had already developed the disease.

Effective antimicrobial treatment of bubonic plague began in the late 1930s. In 1937, physicians in East Africa and India successfully treated patients with Prontosil, a sulfonamide antibacterial drug; their findings were reported in 1938. Although sulfonamides reduced mortality, they were less effective against advanced infection. A major breakthrough occurred in 1947 with the introduction of streptomycin. Early clinical reports documented successful treatment of plague patients in Argentina, Palestine, and India. In an Indian series of 118 patients with bubonic plague treated with streptomycin, only four (3.4%) died. Streptomycin proved substantially more effective than sulfonamides, particularly when administered early in the course of infection.

Several classes of antibiotic are now known to be effective in treating bubonic plague. These include aminoglycosides such as streptomycin and gentamicin, tetracyclines (especially doxycycline), and the fluoroquinolone ciprofloxacin. Mortality associated with treated cases of bubonic plague is about 1–15%, compared to a mortality of 40–60% in untreated cases.

People potentially infected with the plague need immediate treatment and should be given antibiotics within 24 hours of the first symptoms to prevent death. Other treatments include oxygen, intravenous fluids, and respiratory support. People who have had contact with anyone infected by pneumonic plague are given prophylactic antibiotics. Using the broad-based antibiotic streptomycin has proven to be dramatically successful against the bubonic plague within 12 hours of infection.

== Epidemiology ==
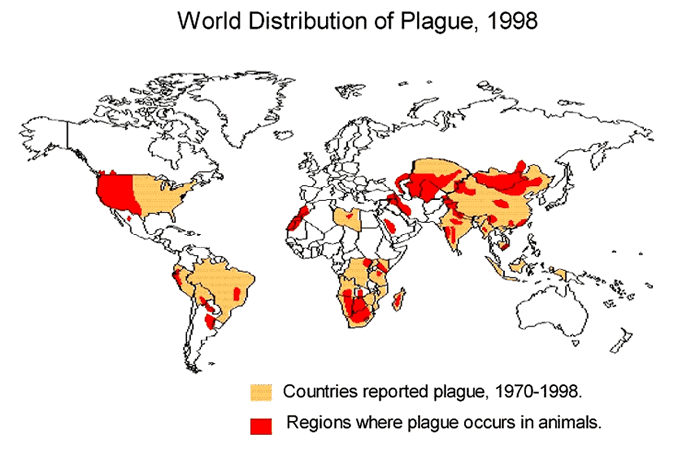
Distribution of plague-infected animals, 1998

Globally between 2010 and 2015, there were 3,248 documented cases, which resulted in 584 deaths. The countries with the greatest number of cases are the Democratic Republic of the Congo, Madagascar, and Peru.

For over a decade since 2001, Zambia, India, Malawi, Algeria, China, Peru, and the Democratic Republic of the Congo had the most plague cases, with over 1,100 cases in the Democratic Republic of the Congo alone. From 1,000 to 2,000 cases are conservatively reported per year to the WHO. From 2012 to 2017, reflecting political unrest and poor hygienic conditions, Madagascar began to host regular epidemics.

Between 1900 and 2015, the United States had 1,036 human plague cases, with an average of 9 cases per year. In 2015, 16 people in the western United States developed plague, including 2 cases in Yosemite National Park. These US cases usually occur in rural northern New Mexico, northern Arizona, southern Colorado, California, southern Oregon, and far western Nevada.

In November 2017, the Madagascar Ministry of Health reported an outbreak to the WHO (World Health Organization) with more cases and deaths than any recent outbreak in the country. Unusually, most of the cases were pneumonic rather than bubonic.

In June 2018, a child was confirmed to be the first person in Idaho to be infected by bubonic plague in nearly 30 years.

A couple died in May 2019, in Mongolia, while hunting marmots. Another two people in the province of Inner Mongolia, China, were treated in November 2019 for the disease.

In July 2020, in Bayannur, Inner Mongolia of China, a human case of bubonic plague was reported. Officials responded by activating a city-wide plague-prevention system for the remainder of the year. Also in July 2020, in Mongolia, a teenager died from bubonic plague after consuming infected marmot meat.

== History ==
Yersinia pestis has been discovered in archaeological finds from the Late Bronze Age (~3800 BP). Ancient DNA has been used to track the movement of different variants of the bacterium across Asia and Europe between 2800–5000 BP, with the bacterial DNA extracted from the teeth of humans who had been infected while alive. Some authors have suggested that the plague was responsible for the Neolithic decline.

=== First pandemic ===
The first recorded epidemic affected the Sasanian Empire and their arch-rivals, the Eastern Roman Empire (Byzantine Empire) and was named the Plague of Justinian (541–549 AD) after emperor Justinian I, who was infected but survived through extensive treatment. The pandemic resulted in the deaths of an estimated 25 million (6th century outbreak) to 50 million people (two centuries of recurrence). The historian Procopius wrote, in Volume II of History of the Wars, of his personal encounter with the plague and the effect it had on the rising empire.

In the spring of 542, the plague arrived in Constantinople, working its way from port city to port city and spreading around the Mediterranean Sea, later migrating inland eastward into Asia Minor and west into Greece and Italy. The Plague of Justinian is said to have been "completed" in the middle of the 8th century. Because the infectious disease spread inland by the transferring of merchandise through Justinian's efforts in acquiring luxurious goods of the time and exporting supplies, his capital became the leading exporter of the bubonic plague. Procopius, in his work Secret History, declared that Justinian was a demon of an emperor who either created the plague himself or was being punished for his sinfulness.

=== Second pandemic ===
Citizens of Tournai bury plague victims. Miniature from The Chronicles of Gilles Li Muisis (1272–1352). Bibliothèque royale de Belgique, MS 13076–77, f. 24v.

Spread of bubonic plague through time in Europe (2nd pandemic: 1347-1351)

Medieval society's increasing population was put to deadly halt when, in the Late Middle Ages, Europe experienced the deadliest disease outbreak in history. They called it the Great Dying or The Great Pestilence, later coined The Black Death. Lasting in potency for roughly six years, 1346–1352, the Black Death claimed one-third of the European human population, with mortality rates as high as 70%–80%. Some historians believe that society subsequently became more violent as the mass mortality rate cheapened life and thus increased warfare, crime, popular revolt, waves of flagellants, and persecution. The Black Death originated in Central Asia and spread from Italy and then throughout other European countries. Arab historians Ibn Al-Wardni and Almaqrizi believed the Black Death originated in Mongolia. Chinese records also show a huge outbreak in Mongolia in the early 1330s.

In 2022, researchers presented evidence that the plague originated near Lake Issyk-Kul in Kyrgyzstan. The Mongols had cut the trade route (the Silk Road) between China and Europe, which halted the spread of the Black Death from eastern Russia to Western Europe. The European epidemic may have begun with the siege of Caffa, an attack that Mongols launched on the Italian merchants' last trading station in the region, Caffa, in the Crimea.

In late 1346, plague broke out among the besiegers and from them penetrated the town. The Mongol forces catapulted plague-infested corpses into Caffa as a form of attack, one of the first known instances of biological warfare. When spring arrived, the Italian merchants fled on their ships, unknowingly carrying the Black Death. Carried by the fleas on rats, the plague initially spread to humans near the Black Sea and then outwards to the rest of Europe as a result of people fleeing from one area to another. Rats migrated with humans, traveling among grain bags, clothing, ships, wagons, and grain husks. Continued research indicates that black rats, those that primarily transmitted the disease, prefer grain as a primary meal. Due to this, the major bulk grain fleets that transported major cities' food shipments from Africa and Alexandria to heavily populated areas, and were then unloaded by hand, played a role in increasing the transmission effectiveness of the plague.

=== Third pandemic ===
The plague resurfaced for a third time in the mid-19th century; this is also known as "the modern pandemic". Like the two previous outbreaks, this one also originated in Eastern Asia, most likely in Yunnan, a province of China, where there are several natural plague foci. The initial outbreaks occurred in the second half of the 18th century. The disease remained localized in Southwest China for several years before spreading. In the city of Canton, beginning in January 1894, the disease had killed 80,000 people by June. Daily water traffic with the nearby city of Hong Kong rapidly spread the plague there, killing over 2,400 within two months during the 1894 Hong Kong plague.

The third pandemic spread the disease to port cities throughout the world in the second half of the 19th century and the early 20th century via shipping routes. The plague infected people in Chinatown in San Francisco from 1900 to 1904, and in the nearby locales of Oakland and the East Bay again from 1907 to 1909. During the former outbreak, in 1902, authorities made permanent the Chinese Exclusion Act, a law originally signed into existence by President Chester A. Arthur in 1882. The Act was supposed to last for 10 years, but was renewed in 1892 with the Geary Act, then followed by the 1902 decision. The last major outbreak in the United States occurred in Los Angeles in 1924, though the disease is still present in wild rodents and can be passed to humans who come in contact with them. According to the World Health Organization, the pandemic was considered active until 1959, when worldwide casualties dropped to 200 per year. In 1994, a plague outbreak in five Indian states caused an estimated 700 infections (including 52 deaths) and triggered a large migration of Indians within India as they tried to avoid the disease.

It was during the 1894 Hong Kong plague outbreak that Alexandre Yersin isolated the bacterium responsible (Yersinia pestis), a few days after Japanese bacteriologist Kitasato Shibasaburō had isolated it. However, the latter's description was imprecise and also expressed doubts of its relation to the disease, and thus the bacterium is today only named after Yersin.

== Society and culture ==
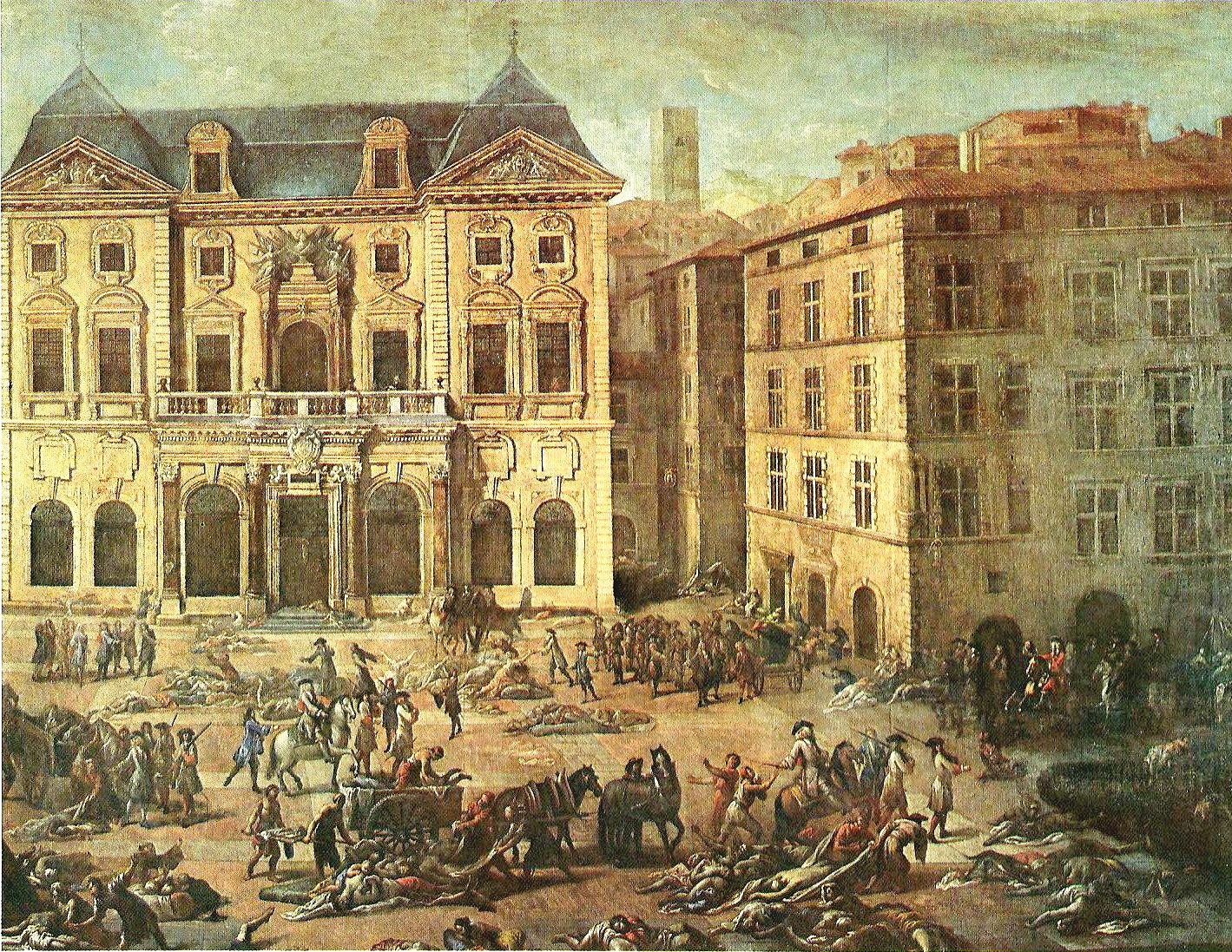
Contemporary engraving of Marseille during the Great Plague in 1720

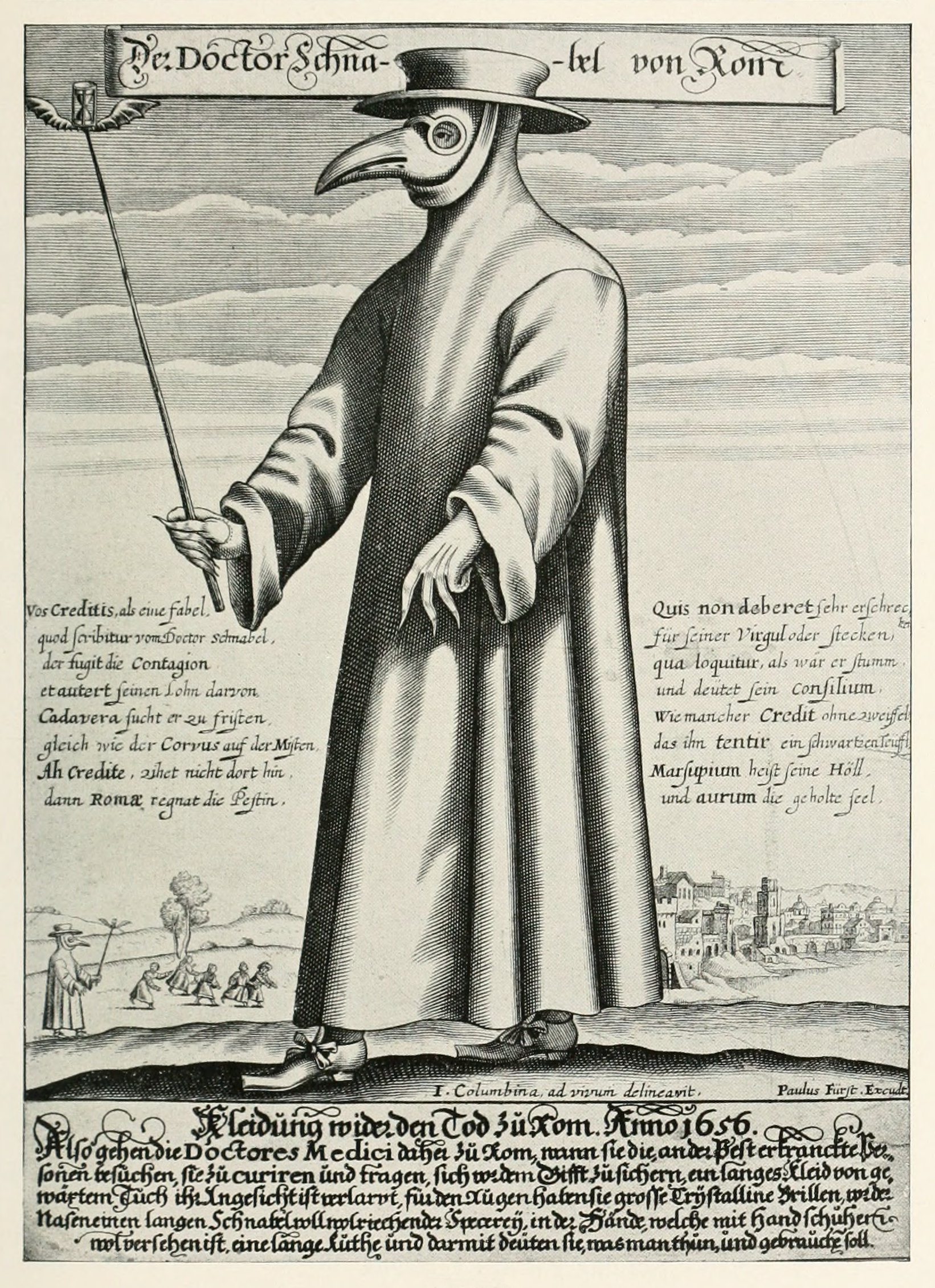
Copper engraving of a plague doctor from the 17th century. This is one of the most well-known representations in art of the bubonic plague

The scale of death and social upheaval associated with plague outbreaks has made the topic prominent in many historical and fictional accounts since the disease was first recognized. The Black Death in particular is described and referenced in numerous contemporary sources, some of which, including works by Chaucer, Boccaccio, and Petrarch, are considered part of the Western canon. The Decameron, by Boccaccio, is notable for its use of a frame story involving individuals who have fled Florence for a secluded villa to escape the Black Death. First-person, sometimes sensationalized or fictionalized, accounts of living through plague years have also been popular across centuries and cultures. For example, Samuel Pepys's diary makes several references to his first-hand experiences of the Great Plague of London in 1665–66.

Later works, such as Albert Camus's novel The Plague or Ingmar Bergman's film The Seventh Seal have used bubonic plague in settings, such as quarantined cities in either medieval or modern times, as a backdrop to explore themes including the breakdown of society, institutions, and individuals during the plague; the cultural and psychological existential confrontation with mortality; and the plague as an allegory raising contemporary moral or spiritual questions.

=== Biological warfare ===
Some of the earliest instances of biological warfare were said to have been products of the plague, as armies of the 14th century were recorded catapulting diseased corpses over the walls of towns and villages to spread the pestilence. This was done by Jani Beg when he attacked the city of Kaffa in 1347.

Later, plague was used during the Second Sino-Japanese War as a bacteriological weapon by the Imperial Japanese Army. These weapons were provided by Shirō Ishii's units and used in experiments on humans before being used in the field. For example, in 1940, the Imperial Japanese Army Air Service bombed Ningbo with fleas carrying the bubonic plague. During the Khabarovsk War Crime Trials, the accused, such as Major General Kiyoshi Kawashima, testified that, in 1941, 40 members of Unit 731 air-dropped plague-contaminated fleas on Changde. These operations caused epidemic plague outbreaks.

=== Continued research ===
Substantial research has been done regarding the origin of the plague and how it traveled through the continent. Mitochondrial DNA of modern rats in Western Europe indicated that these rats came from two different areas, one being Africa and the other unclear. The research regarding this pandemic has greatly increased with technology. Through archaeo-molecular investigation, researchers have discovered the DNA of plague bacillus in the dental core of those that fell ill to the plague. Analysis of teeth of the deceased allows researchers to further understand both the demographics and mortuary patterns of the disease. For example, in 2013 in England, archeologists uncovered a burial mound to reveal 17 bodies, mainly children, who had died of the bubonic plague. They analyzed these burial remains using radiocarbon dating to determine they were from the 1530s, and dental core analysis revealed the presence of Yersinia pestis.

Other evidence for rats that are currently still being researched consists of gnaw marks on bones, predator pellets and rat remains that were preserved in situ. This research allows individuals to trace early rat remains to track the path traveled and in turn connect the impact of the bubonic plague to specific breeds of rats. Burial sites, known as plague pits, offer archaeologists an opportunity to study the remains of people who died from the plague.

Another research study indicates that these separate pandemics were all interconnected. A current computer model indicates that the disease did not go away between these pandemics. It rather lurked within the rat population for years without causing human epidemics.

== See also ==
- List of cutaneous conditions
- List of epidemics
- Miasma theory
- Plague (disease)
- Plague doctor
- Hidradenitis suppurativa
