= Glossitis =

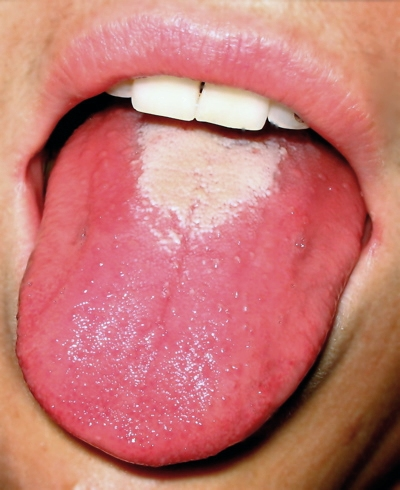
- Glossitis in a person with scarlet fever ("red strawberry tongue").
- Specialty: Gastroenterology
- Complications: Some speech impairments

Glossitis can mean soreness of the tongue, or more usually inflammation with depapillation of the dorsal surface of the tongue (loss of the lingual papillae), leaving a smooth and erythematous (reddened) surface, (sometimes specifically termed atrophic glossitis). In a wider sense, glossitis can mean inflammation of the tongue generally. Glossitis is often caused by nutritional deficiencies and may be painless or cause discomfort. Glossitis usually responds well to treatment if the cause is identified and corrected. Tongue soreness caused by glossitis is differentiated from burning mouth syndrome, where there is no identifiable change in the appearance of the tongue, and there are no identifiable causes.

== Symptoms ==
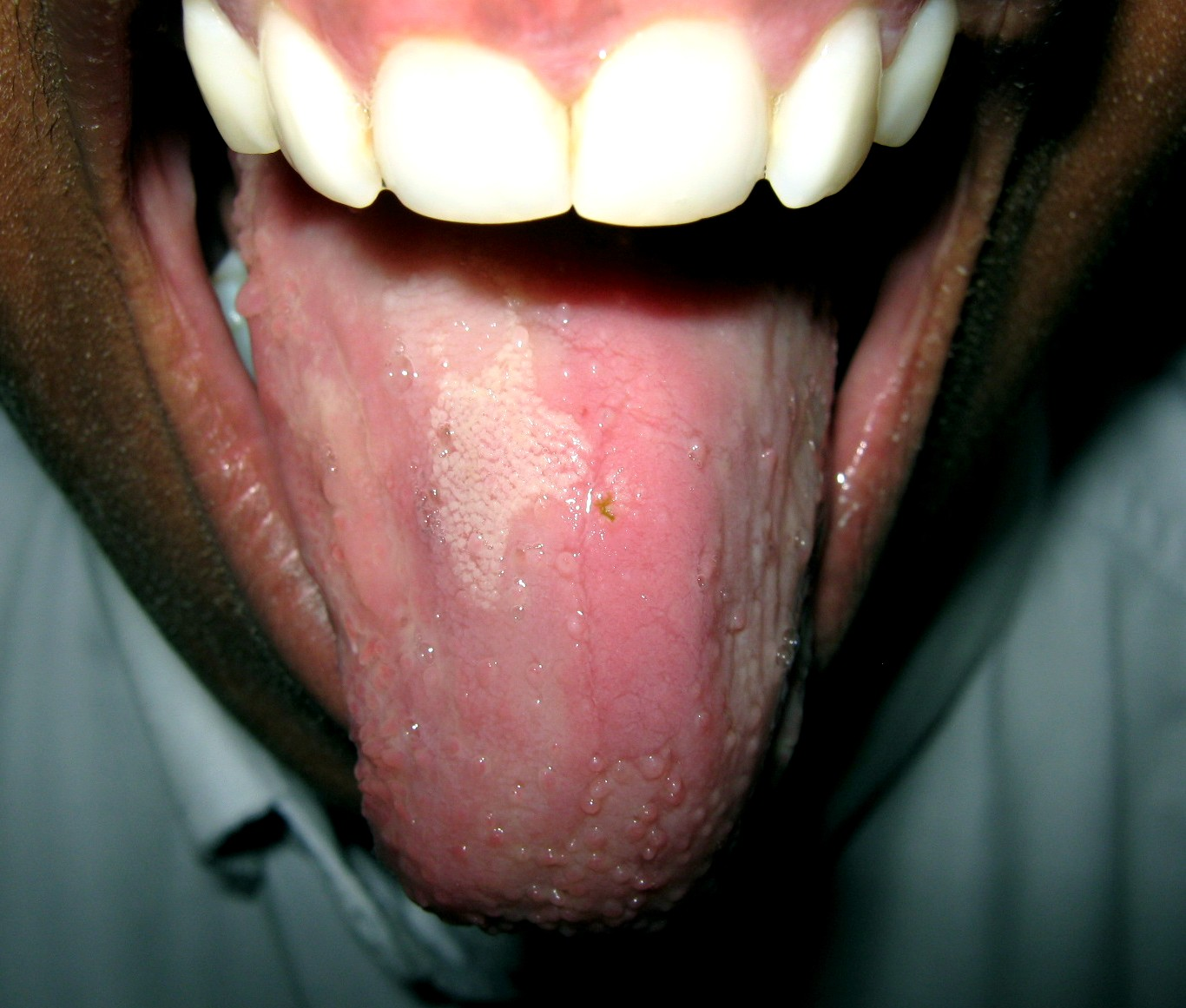
Patchy depapillation of filiform papillae with prominence of the fungiform papillae.

Depending upon what exact meaning of the word glossitis is implied, signs and symptoms might include:

- Smooth, shiny appearance of the tongue, caused by loss of lingual papillae.
- Tongue color changes, usually to a darker red color than the normal white-pink color of a healthy tongue.
- Tongue swelling.
- Difficulty with chewing, swallowing, or speaking (either because of tongue soreness or tongue swelling).
- Burning sensation. Some use the term secondary burning mouth syndrome in cases where a detectable cause, such as glossitis, for an oral burning sensation.

Depending upon the underlying cause, there may be additional signs and symptoms such as pallor, oral ulceration and angular cheilitis.

== Causes ==
=== Anemias ===
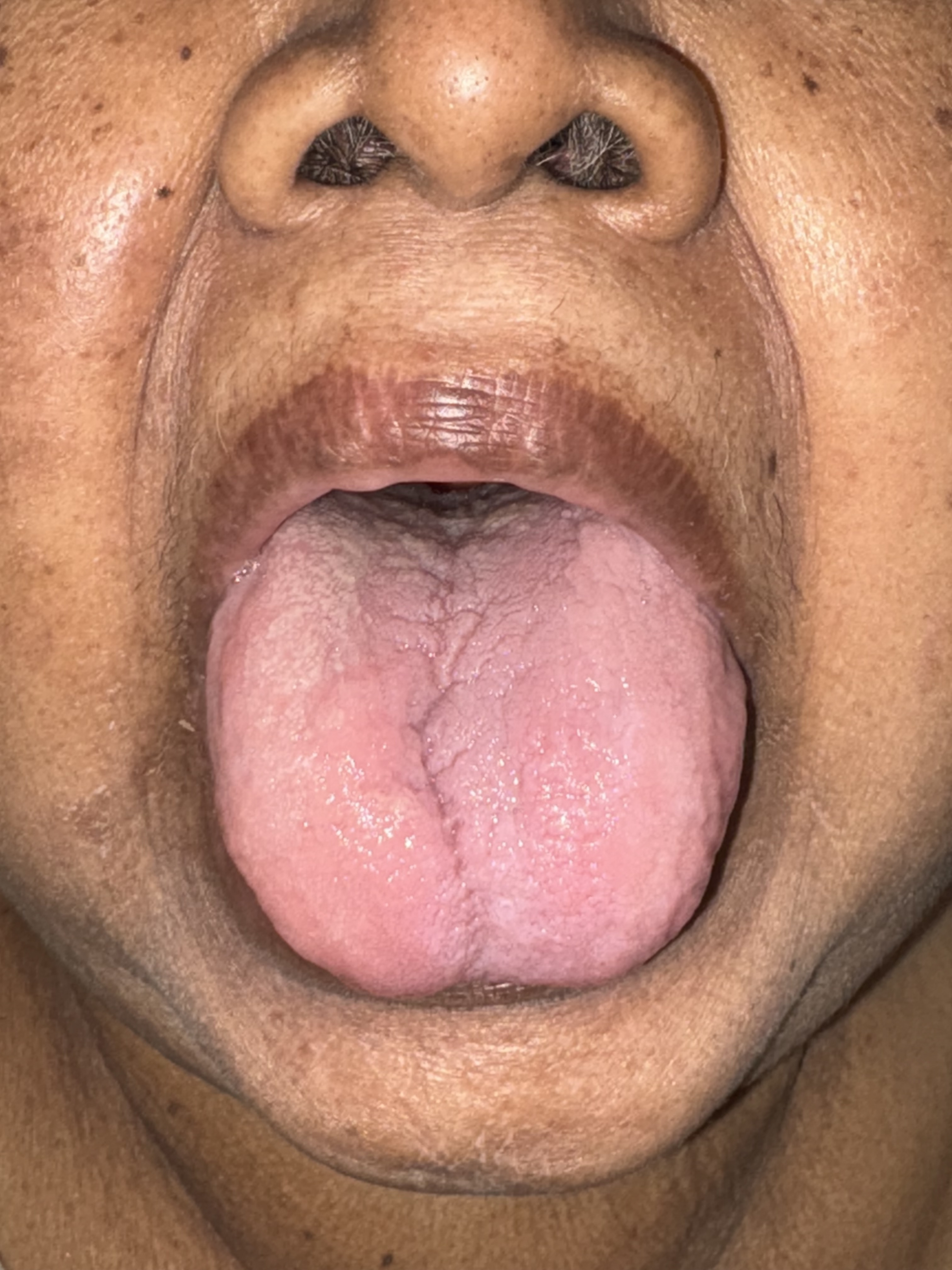
A case of glossitis due to iron-deficiency anemia in a Thai female adult

Iron-deficiency anemia is mainly caused by blood loss, such as may occur during menses or gastrointestinal hemorrhage. This often results in a depapilled, atrophic glossitis, giving the tongue a bald and shiny appearance, along with pallor (paleness) of the lips and other mucous membranes a tendency towards recurrent oral ulceration, and angular cheilitis (crockings and inflammation at the corners of the lips). The appearance of the tongue in iron-deficiency anemia has been described as diffuse or patchy atrophy with tenderness or burning. One cause of iron-deficiency anemia is sideropenic dysphagia (Plummer–Vinson syndrome, also called Paterson–Brown–Kelly syndrome) which is also characterized by esophageal webbing and dysphagia.

Pernicious anemia is usually caused by autoimmune destruction of gastric parietal cells. Parietal cells secrete intrinsic factor which is required for the absorption of vitamin B12. Vitamin B12 deficiency results in megaloblastic anemia and may present as atrophic glossitis (Hunter's atrophic glossitis). The appearance of the tongue in vitamin B12 deficiency is described as "beefy" or "fiery red and sore". There may be linear or patchy red lesions.

=== Vitamin B deficiencies ===
Vitamin B1 deficiency (thiamine deficiency) can cause glossitis. Vitamin B2 deficiency (ariboflavinosis) can cause glossitis, along with angular cheilitis, cheilosis, peripheral neuropathy and other signs and symptoms. The glossitis in vitamin B2 deficiency is described as magenta. Vitamin B3 deficiency (pellagra) can cause glossitis. Vitamin B6 deficiency (pyridoxine deficiency) can cause glossitis, along with angular cheilitis, cheilosis, peripheral neuropathy and seborrheic dermatitis. Folate deficiency (vitamin B9 deficiency) can cause glossitis, along with macrocytic anemia, thrombocytopenia, leukopenia, diarrhea, fatigue and possibly neurological signs. Apart from pernicious anemia discussed above, any other cause of vitamin B12 deficiency can cause atrophic glossitis (Hunter's atrophic glossitis), which tends to be painful, smooth and shiny.

=== Infections ===
Bacterial, viral or fungal infections can cause glossitis. Chronic Candida infections of the tongue can cause an atrophic glossitis known as median rhomboid glossitis.

Syphilis is now relatively rare, but the tertiary stage can cause diffuse glossitis and atrophy of lingual papillae, termed "syphilitic glossitis", "luetic glossitis" or "atrophic glossitis of tertiary syphilis". It is caused by Treponema pallidum and is a sexually transmitted infection.

=== Other causes ===
Many conditions can cause glossitis via malnutrition or malabsorption, which creates the nutritional deficiencies described above, although other mechanisms may be involved in some of those conditions listed.

- Alcoholism
- Sprue (celiac disease, or tropical sprue), secondary to nutritional deficiencies
- Crohn's disease
- Whipple disease
- Glucagonoma syndrome
- Cowden disease
- Acquired immunodeficiency syndrome (AIDS)
- Carcinoid syndrome
- Kwashiorkor amyloidosis
- Veganism and other specialized diets, without B12 supplementation.
- Poor hydration and low saliva in the mouth, which allows bacteria to grow more readily
- Mechanical irritation or injury from burns, rough edges of teeth or dental appliances, or other trauma
- Tongue piercing Glossitis can be caused by the constant irritation by the ornament and by colonization of Candida albicans in site and on the ornament
- Exposure to irritants such as tobacco, alcohol, hot foods, or spices
- Allergic reaction to toothpaste, mouthwash, breath fresheners, dyes in confectionery, plastic in dentures or retainers, or certain blood-pressure medications (ACE inhibitors)
- Administration of ganglion blockers (e.g., Tubocurarine, Mecamylamine).
- Oral lichen planus, erythema multiforme, aphthous ulcer, pemphigus vulgaris
- Heredity
- Albuterol (bronchodilator medicine)

A painful tongue may be an indication of an underlying serious medical condition and nearly always merits assessment by a physician or dental surgeon.

== Diagnosis ==
=== Classification ===
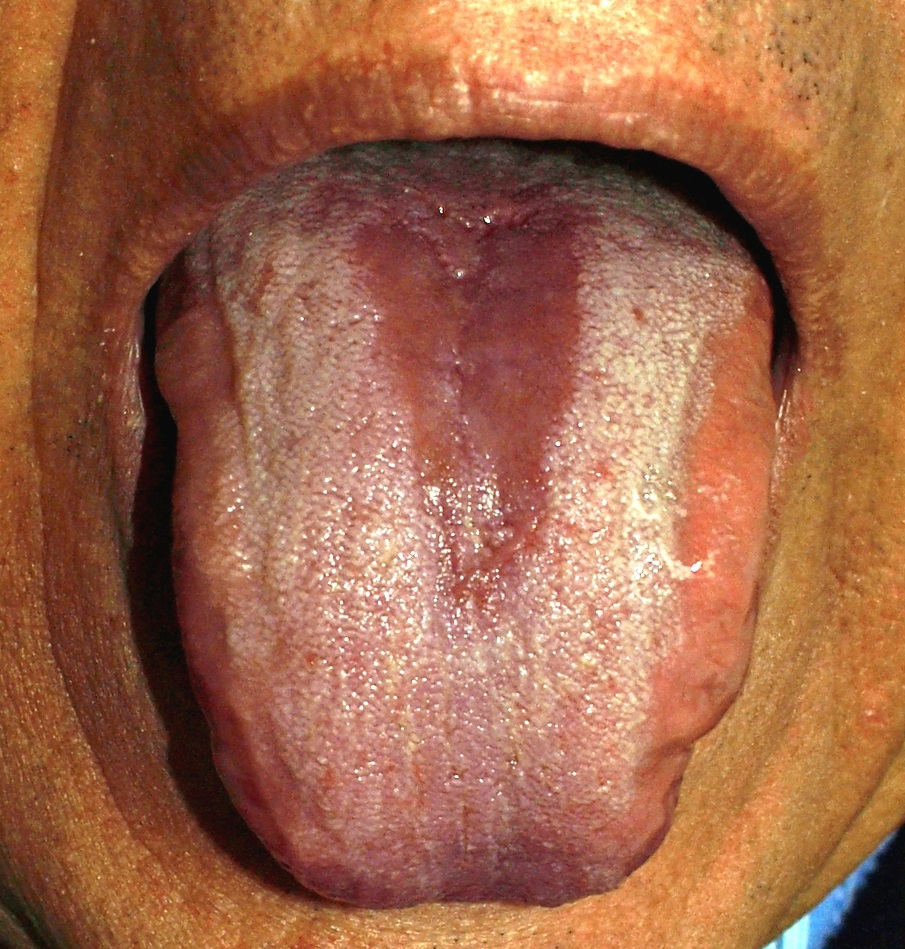
Median rhomboid glossitis

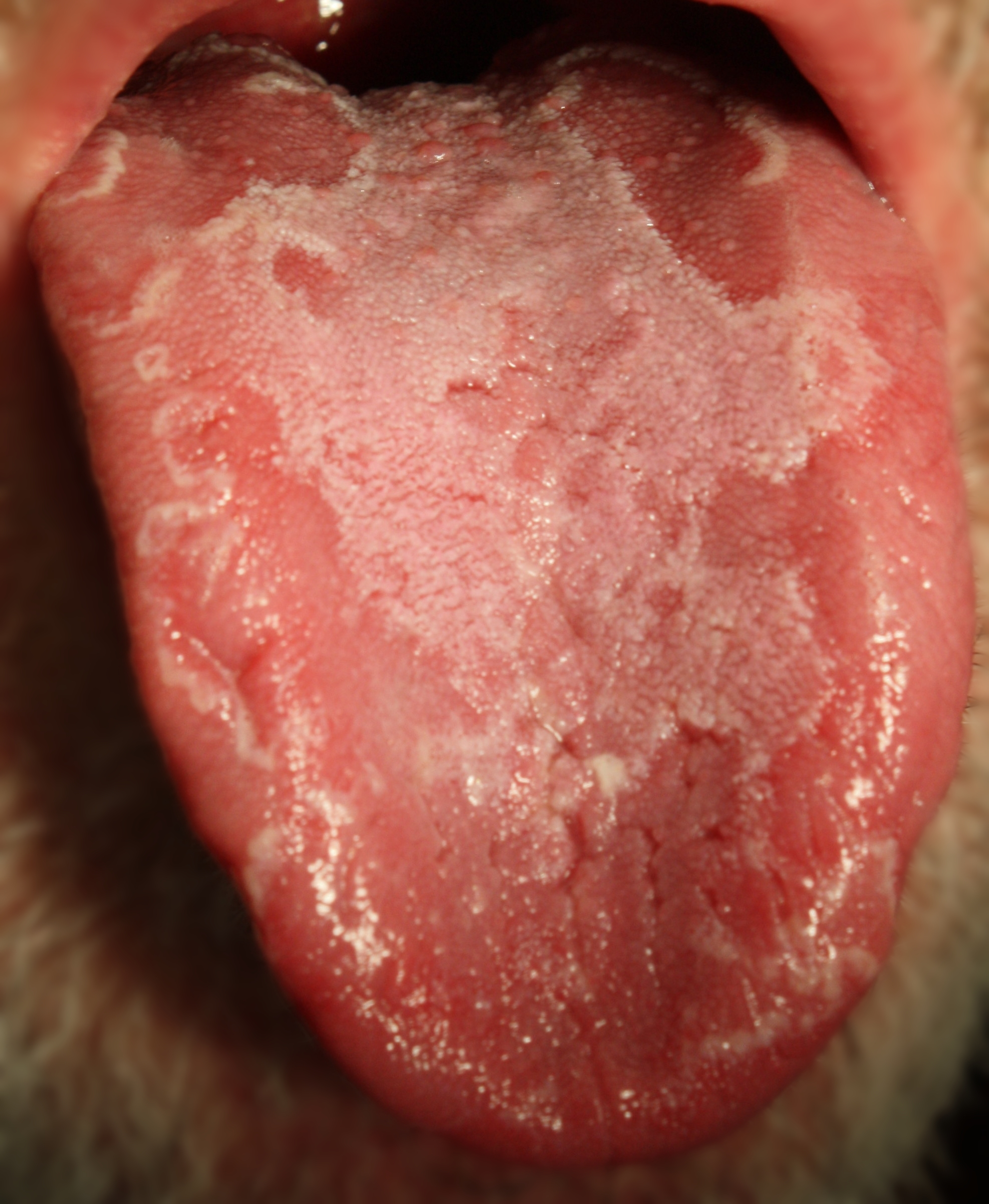
Geographic tongue (benign migratory glossitis)

Glossitis could be classified as a group of tongue diseases or gastrointestinal diseases. It may be primary, where there is no underlying cause, or secondary where it is a sign or symptom of another condition. It can be acute or chronic. Generally speaking, there are several clinical patterns of glossitis, some more common than others.

==== Atrophic glossitis ====
Atrophic glossitis, also known as bald tongue, smooth tongue, Hunter glossitis, Moeller glossitis, or Möller-Hunter glossitis, is a condition characterized by a smooth glossy tongue that is often tender/painful, caused by complete atrophy of the lingual papillae (depapillation). The dorsal tongue surface may be affected totally, or in patches, and may be associated with a burning sensation, pain and/or erythema. Atrophic glossitis is a non-specific finding, and has a great many causes, usually related to iron-deficiency anemia, pernicious anemia, B vitamin complex deficiencies, unrecognized and untreated celiac disease (which often presents without gastrointestinal symptoms), or other factors such as xerostomia (dry mouth). Although the terms Möller and Hunter glossitis were originally used to refer to specifically the glossitis that occurs in vitamin B12 deficiency secondary to pernicious anemia, they are now used as synonyms for atrophic glossitis generally. In this article, the term glossitis, unless otherwise specified, refers to atrophic glossitis.

Candidiasis may be a concurrent finding or an alternative cause of erythema, burning, and atrophy.

==== Median rhomboid glossitis ====
This condition is characterized by a persistent erythematous, rhomboidal depapillated lesion in the central area of the dorsum of the tongue, just in front of the circumvallate papillae. Median rhomboid glossitis is a type of oral candidiasis, and rarely causes any symptoms. It is treated with antifungal medication. Predisposing factors include use of corticosteroid sprays or inhalers or immunosuppression.

==== Benign migratory glossitis ====
Geographic tongue, also termed benign migratory glossitis, is a common condition which usually affects the dorsal surface of the tongue. It is characterized by patches of depapillation and erythema bordered by a whitish peripheral zone. These patches give the tongue the appearance of a map, hence the name. Unlike glossitis due to nutritional deficiencies and anemia, the lesions of geographic tongue move around the tongue over time. This is because in geographic tongue, new areas of the tongue become involved with the condition whilst previously affected areas heal, giving the appearance of a moving lesion. The cause is unknown, and there is no curative treatment. Rarely are there any symptoms associated with the lesions, but occasionally a burning sensation may be present, which is exacerbated by eating hot, spicy or acidic foodstuffs. Some consider geographic tongue to be an early stage of fissured tongue, since the two conditions often occur in combination.

==== Geometric glossitis ====
Geometric glossitis, also termed herpetic geometric glossitis, is a term used by some to refer to a chronic lesion associated with herpes simplex virus (HSV) type I infection, in which there is a deep fissure in the midline of the tongue, which gives off multiple branches. The lesion is usually very painful, and there may be erosions present in the depths of the fissures. Similar fissured lesions which are not associated with HSV, as may occur in fissured tongue, do not tend to be painful. The name comes from the geometric pattern of the fissures which are longitudinal, crossed or branched. It is described as occurring in immunocompromised persons, e.g. who have leukemia. However, the association between herpes simplex and geometric glossitis is disputed by some due to a lack of gold standard techniques for diagnosis of intraoral herpetic lesions, and the high prevalence of asymptomatic viral shedding in immunocompromised individuals. Treatment is with systemic aciclovir.

==== Strawberry tongue ====
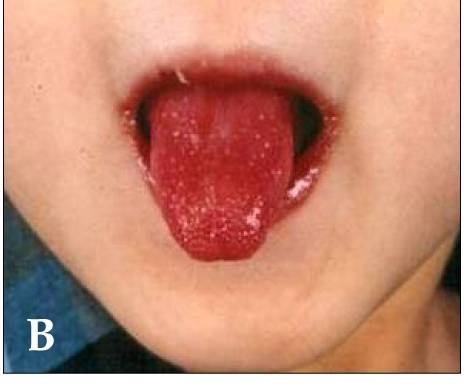
Distinct strawberry tongue with "parched" lips as seen in a young child with Kawasaki disease.

Strawberry tongue, or raspberry tongue, is glossitis which manifests with hyperplastic (enlarged) fungiform papillae, giving the appearance of a strawberry. White strawberry tongue is where there is a white coating on the tongue through which the hyperplastic fungiform papillae protrude. Red strawberry tongue is where the white coating is lost and a dark red, erythematous surface is revealed, interspaced with the hyperplastic fungiform papillae. White strawberry tongue is seen in early scarlet fever (a systemic infection of group A β- hemolytic streptococci), and red strawberry tongue occurs later, after 4–5 days. Strawberry tongue is also seen in Kawasaki disease (a vasculitic disorder primarily occurring in children under 5), and toxic shock syndrome. It may mimic other types of glossitis or Vitamin B12 deficiency.

== Treatment ==
The goal of treatment is to reduce inflammation. Treatment usually does not require hospitalization unless tongue swelling is severe. Good oral hygiene is necessary, including thorough tooth brushing at least twice a day, and flossing at least daily. Corticosteroids such as prednisone may be given to reduce the inflammation of glossitis. For mild cases, topical applications (such as a prednisone mouth rinse that is not swallowed) may be recommended to avoid the side effects of swallowed or injected corticosteroids. Antibiotics, antifungal medications, or other antimicrobials may be prescribed if the cause of glossitis is an infection. Anemia and nutritional deficiencies (such as a deficiency in niacin, riboflavin, iron, or Vitamin E) must be treated, often by dietary changes or other supplements. Avoiding irritants (such as hot or spicy foods, alcohol, and tobacco) may minimize the discomfort. In some cases, tongue swelling may threaten the airway, a medical emergency that needs immediate attention.

== Epidemiology ==
One review reported overall prevalence ranges of 0.1–14.3% for geographic tongue, 1.3–9.0% for "atrophy tongue" (atrophic glossitis), and 0.0–3.35% for median rhomboid glossitis.
