= Coronary artery ectasia =

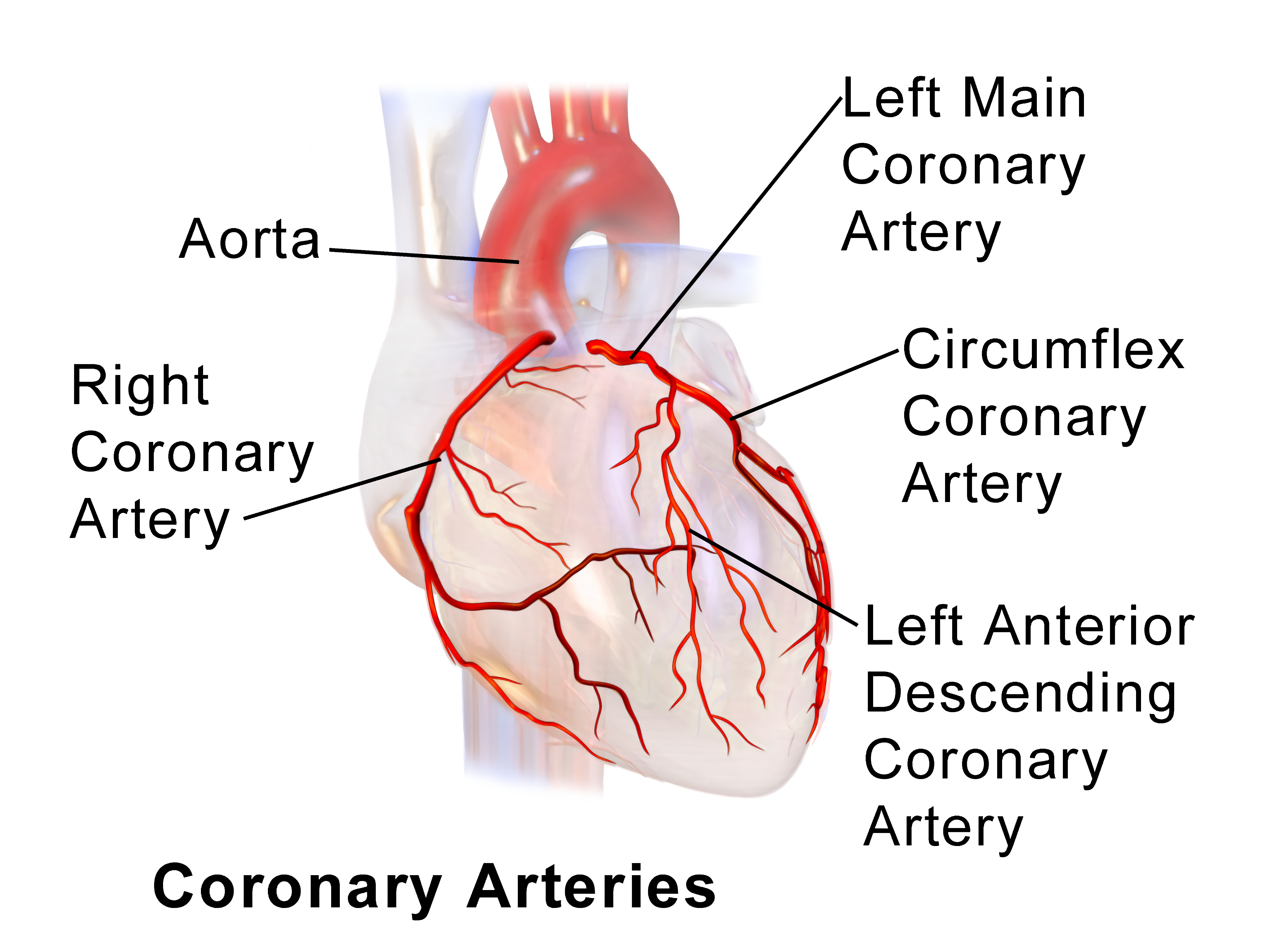
- Coronary arteries are affected by this condition
- Specialty: Cardiology

Coronary artery ectasia is a rare disease that occurs in only 0.3-4.9% of people in North America. Coronary artery ectasia is characterized by the enlargement of a coronary artery to 1.5 times or more than its normal diameter. The disease is commonly asymptomatic and is normally discovered when performing tests for other conditions such as coronary artery disease, stable angina and other acute coronary syndromes. Coronary artery ectasia occurs 4 times more frequently in males than in females and in people who have risk factors for heart disease such as smokers. While the disease is commonly found in patients with atherosclerosis and coronary artery disease, it can occur by itself and in both cases, it can cause health problems. The disease can cause the heart tissue to be deprived of blood and die due to decreased blood flow, and blockages due to blood clots or spasms of the blood vessel. This blood flow disruption can cause permanent damage to the muscle if the deprivation is prolonged. Coronary artery ectasia also increases the chance of developing large weak spots in the affected coronary arteries, or aneurysms that can rupture and result in death. The damage can result in angina which is pain in the chest and is a common complaint in these patients.

== Pathology ==
Coronary artery ectasia is commonly found in patients with diseases of the connective tissue and an increased inflammatory response such as Marfan syndrome and Kawasaki Disease. It can also be found transiently in patients that have undergone stent placement resulting in the stretching of the vessels 1. Coronary artery ectasia is characterized by an increased wall stress of the vessel, thinning of the arterial wall which causes progressive dilation and remodelling of the vessel. The permanent dilation of the artery is thought to be mainly caused by inflammation, triggered by disease, chemicals, or physical stress of the vessel. A meta-analysis study has shown that The pooled unadjusted OR of CAE in subjects with HTN in comparison by subjects without HTN was estimated 1.44 (95 % CI, 1.24 to 1.68) Bahremand, M., Zereshki, E., Matin, B.K. et al. Hypertension and coronary artery ectasia: a systematic review and meta-analysis study. Clin Hypertens 27, 14 (2021). https://doi.org/10.1186/s40885-021-00170-6.The inflammatory response results in an over expression of matrix metalloproteinases, cysteine proteinases, and serine proteinases that causes the partial breakdown of the vessel and weakens it. The inflammation response will also trigger platelet activation which increases the risk of blood clots. The risk of blood clots will increase due to the turbulent blood flow of the enlarged vessel which can activate platelets and form clots. Inflammation elevated oxidative stress is increased, and antioxidant activity is depressed in coronary artery ectasia. This imbalance can cause damage to the cells and cause them to die, weakening the vessels further. The activation of the inflammatory response causes a detectable increase in C reactive protein, interleukin-6, tumor necrosis factor alpha and cell adhesion molecules, which can be used as a diagnostic marker,.

== Diagnosis ==
To discover the extent and severity of coronary artery ectasia there are a variety of diagnostic tools used. The most common method for discovering the disease is through angiography. Angiography is the procedure where a contrast dye is entered into the vessels and an x-ray is taken, which will allow the vessels to be seen on the x-ray. Using angiography clinicians are able to display the size, location and number of vessels affected by the disease. Is can also be analyzed through other methods such as intravascular ultrasound, and magnetic resonance imaging. Using these diagnostic methods, it has been discovered that the disease normally occurs most often in the right coronary artery, followed by the left anterior descending artery, and finally the left anterior circumflex artery. Using these methods Coronary artery ectasia can be divided into four different types: Type 1¬→diffuse ectasia in 2-3 different vessels, Type 2¬→ diffuse disease in 1 vessel and local disease in another, Type 3¬→ diffuse disease in one vessel and Type 4¬→ localized or segmental ectasia.

== Treatment ==
There are currently no cardiovascular society guidelines or recommendations for the treatment of coronary artery ectasia. Experts in the field urge clinicians to consider anti-platelet therapy, such as Aspirin, to reduce thrombus formation in pocket vortices associated with turbulent blood flow. Dual anti-platelet therapy and full anticoagulation are currently under investigation. The primary etiology of coronary ectasia in adults is atherosclerosis, thus treatment with statin therapy should be considered. Statin therapy may also reduce inflammation and matrix metalloproteinase activation which may reduce the progression of vessel ectasia. Some studies have also suggested the use of angiotensin converting enzyme inhibitors, as ACE gene polymorphisms have been implicated in disease progression. Risk factor modification is recommended; including tobacco cessation, blood pressure control and avoidance of illicit substance use, specifically cocaine.
