= Acral necrosis =

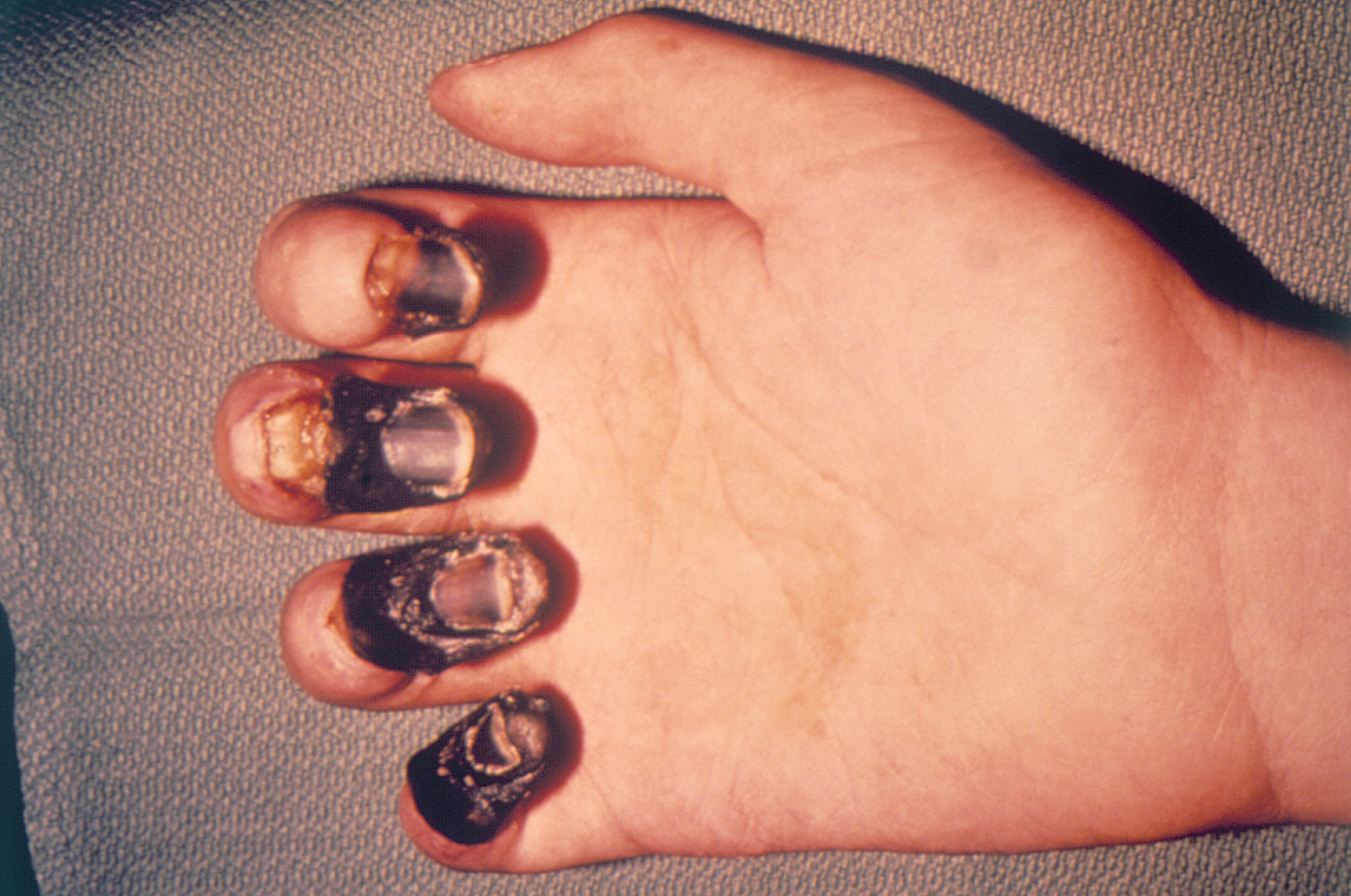
- A hand with acral gangrene due to plague
- Differential diagnosis: bubonic plague

Acral necrosis is a symptom common in bubonic plague. The striking black discoloration of skin and tissue, primarily on the extremities ("acral"), is commonly thought to have given rise to the name "Black Death," associated both with the disease and the pandemic which occurred in the 14th century. The term in fact came from the figural sense of "black"; that is, ghastly or dreadful.

Acral necrosis may be a symptom of other diseases too. It also has been observed as an adverse event related to a medical treatment.
