= Sulfurozador =

Fumigation device

The Sulfurozador was a popular name for a device that emits sulfur dioxide in closed spaces for sanitation purposes, used extensively in South America, especially in Buenos Aires, to kill rat populations. The device was originally invented in France by René Marot, and found more widespread use in times of epidemics, such as the plague epidemic in San Francisco. It was used extensively for fumigation of ships.
