= Coronary artery aneurysm =

- Coronary arteries
- Specialty: Cardiology
- Causes: atherosclerosis, Kawasaki disease, coronary catheterization.
- Diagnostic method: coronary angiography
- Treatment: medical management, surgical excision, coronary bypass grafting (CABG), and percutaneous coronary interventions

Coronary artery aneurysm is an abnormal dilatation of part of the coronary artery. This rare disorder occurs in about 0.3–4.9% of patients who undergo coronary angiography. It occurs more often in men than women, and most commonly involves the right coronary artery.

== Signs and symptoms ==
The majority of individuals suffering from coronary artery aneurysms do not exhibit any symptoms; the development of complications or concurrent atherosclerotic coronary artery disease is what causes clinical manifestations to occur. The most common complications include coronary spasm, distal embolization, aneurysm rupture, local thrombosis, and compression of surrounding structures due to massive enlargement of coronary artery aneurysm.

== Causes ==
Acquired causes include atherosclerosis in adults, Kawasaki disease in children and coronary catheterization. With the invention of drug eluting stents, there has been more cases implying stents lead to coronary aneurysms. The pathophysiology, although not completely understood, might be comparable to that of aneurysms of larger vessels. This includes disruption of the arterial media, weakening of the arterial wall, increased wall strain and slow dilatation of the coronary artery portion.

It can also be congenital. The following risk factors are thought to be associated with coronary artery aneurysms:

1. Individual's genetic make-up, especially in patients with congenital coronary artery aneurysms
2. Coronary artery disease (atherosclerosis)
3. Vasculitic and connective tissue diseases (Kawasaki and Marfan)
4. Intracoronary manipulation leading to local wall stress (stent placement, angioplasty, brachytherapy)
5. Post-infectious as a consequence of direct wall infiltration or immune complex deposition
6. Drug-induced effects, particularly cocaine use, causing episodic hypertension, vasoconstriction, and endothelial damage.

== Diagnosis ==
It is often found coincidentally on coronary angiography. Other modalities that can be used to diagnose a coronary artery aneurysm include echocardiography, magnetic resonance imaging and computerized tomography. Although coronary angiography remains to be the gold standard, the invasive procedure comes with its associated risks, is more expensive than other modalities and the size of the aneurysm might be miscalculated if there is a thrombus in place.

== Treatment ==
Treatment for coronary artery aneurysm include medical management, surgery and percutaneous intervention. Underlying coronary artery risk factors should be addressed in patients with atherosclerosis and proper guideline-mediated medications should be started. In those with risk for embolism or thrombosis, anti-platelet or anticoagulation therapy should be contemplated.

In patients with Kawasaki disease prompt administration of intravenous immunoglobulin (IVIG) therapy should be given to prevent complication of coronary artery aneurysm.

== Prognosis ==
Generally, it has a good prognosis. The prognosis of coronary artery aneurysm is dependent on its diameter. The smaller the aneurysm the better the prognosis. There is less risk for ischemic myocardial damage and mortality with smaller aneurysms. Aneurysms with an internal diameter > 8 mm have poorer outcomes, since these aneurysms can be occluded and be associated with complications such as arrhythmias, myocardial infarction, or sudden death.

== See also ==
- Aneurysm
- Coronary artery ectasia
