= Sprue =

A sprue may refer to:

- Sprue (manufacturing), a feature in molding and casting molds
- Coeliac disease, also known as sprue, a disease of the small intestine
- Tropical sprue, disease
- Sprue Asparagus, first pickings of asparagus
