= Interleukin-1 family =

Group of cytokine proteins

Interleukin-1 / 18
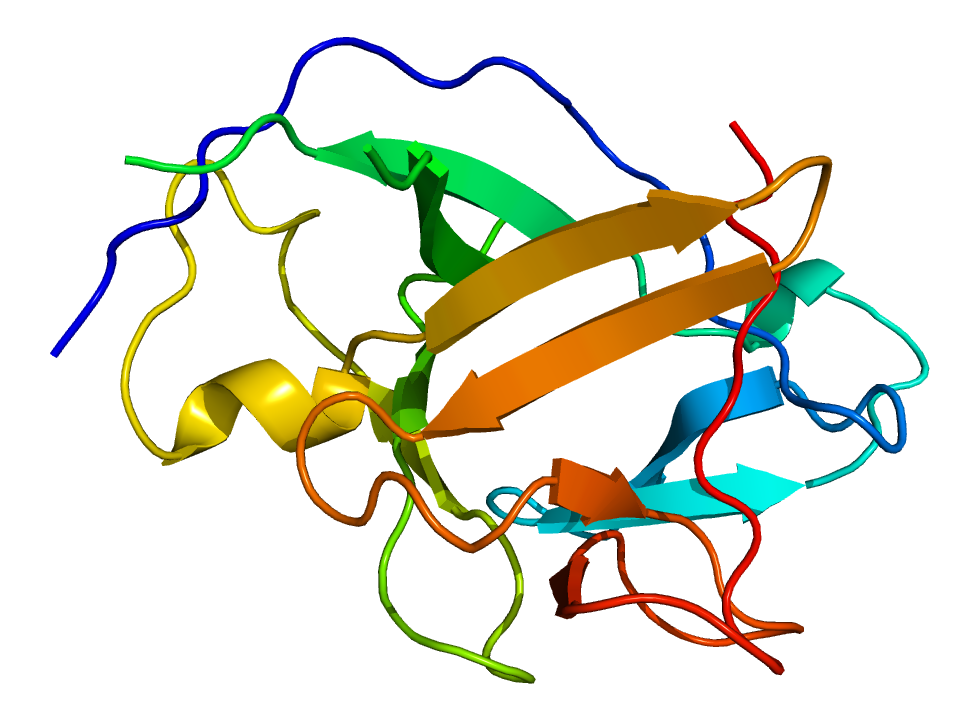
- Crystal structure of IL-1a (PDB: 2ILA).

Identifiers
- Symbol: IL1
- Pfam: PF00340
- InterPro: IPR000975
- PROSITE: PDOC00226
- SCOP2: 1i1b / SCOPe / SUPFAM
Available protein structures:
- PDB: IPR000975 PF00340 (ECOD; PDBsum)
- AlphaFold: IPR000975; PF00340

The Interleukin-1 family (IL-1 family) is a group of 11 cytokines that plays a central role in the regulation of immune and inflammatory responses to infections or sterile insults.

== Discovery ==
Discovery of these cytokines began with studies on the pathogenesis of fever. The studies were performed by Eli Menkin and Paul Beeson in 1943–1948 on the fever-producing properties of proteins released from rabbit peritoneal exudate cells. These studies were followed by contributions of several investigators, who were primarily interested in the link between fever and infection/inflammation. The basis for the term "interleukin" was to streamline the growing number of biological properties attributed to soluble factors from macrophages and lymphocytes. IL-1 was the name given to the macrophage product, whereas IL-2 was used to define the lymphocyte product. At the time of the assignment of these names, there was no amino acid sequence analysis known and the terms were used to define biological properties.

In 1985 two distinct, but distantly related complementary DNAs encoding proteins sharing human IL-1 activity were reported to be isolated from a macrophage cDNA library, thus defining two individual members of the IL-1 family – IL-1α and IL-1β.

== The Interleukin-1 superfamily ==
IL-1 family is a group of 11 cytokines, which induces a complex network of proinflammatory cytokines and via expression of integrins on leukocytes and endothelial cells, regulates and initiates inflammatory responses.

IL-1α and IL-1β are the most studied members because they were discovered first and because they possess strong proinflammatory effects. They have a natural antagonist IL-1Ra (IL-1 receptor antagonist). All three of them include a beta trefoil fold and bind IL-1 receptor (IL-1R) and activate signaling via MyD88 adaptor, which is described in the Signaling section of this page. IL-1Ra regulates IL-1α and IL-1β proinflammatory activity by competing with them for binding sites of the receptor.

Nine IL-1 superfamily members occur in a single cluster on human chromosome two; sequence and chromosomal anatomy evidence suggest these formed through a series of gene duplications of a proto-IL-1β ligand. In this way, IL-1β, IL-1α, IL-36α, IL-36β, IL-36γ, IL-36RA, IL-37, IL-38, and IL-1RA are very likely ancestral family members sharing a common lineage. However, IL-18 and IL-33 are on different chromosomes and there is insufficient sequence or chromosomal anatomy evidence to suggest they share common ancestry with the other IL-1 superfamily members. IL-33 and IL-18 have been included into the IL-1 superfamily due to structural similarities, overlap in function and the receptors involved in their signalling.

=== Synthesis ===
All of the members of IL-1 family, except IL-1Ra, are first synthesized as a precursor protein, which means it is synthesized as a long form of a protein which has to be proteolytically cleaved to a shorter, active molecule, which is generally called a mature protein. IL-1 family precursors do not have a clear signal peptide for processing and secretion and none of them are found in the Golgi; they belong to so-called leaderless secretory protein group. In research, fluorescent reporters can be used to analyze the intracellular cleavage of the protein into its active form. The similar feature of IL-1α and IL-33 is that their precursor forms can bind to their respective receptor and can activate signal transduction. But this is not a common feature for all IL-1 family members, since IL-1β and IL-18 precursor forms do not bind their receptors and require proteolytic cleavage by either intracellular caspase-1 or extracellular neutrophilic proteases.

== Nomenclature ==
The interleukin-1 superfamily has 11 members, which have similar gene structure, although originally it contained only four members IL-1α, IL-1β, IL-1Ra and IL-18. After discovery of another 5 members the updated nomenclature was generally accepted which included all members of IL-1 cytokine family. The old IL-1 members were renamed to IL-1F1, IL-1F2, IL-1F3 and IL-1F4.

But according to new trends in nomenclature, the old names of IL-1 family returned. In 2010, laboratories all around the world agreed that IL-1α, IL-1β, IL-1Ra and IL-18 are more familiar to the general scientific knowledge. According to that, they suggested that IL-1F6, IL-1F8 and IL-1F9 should get new names IL-36α, IL-36β and IL-36γ, even though they are encoded by distinct genes, they use the same receptor complex IL-1Rrp2 and coreceptor IL-1RAcP and deliver almost identical signals. The nomenclature also proposes that IL-1F5 should be renamed to IL-36Ra, because it works as an antagonist to IL-36α, IL-36β and IL-36γ similar to how IL-1Ra works for IL-1α and IL-1β. Another revision was the renaming of IL-1F7 to IL-37 because this suppressing cytokine has many splicing variants, they should be called IL-37a, IL-37b and so on. For IL-1F10 there is a reserved name, IL-38.

Name	Family name	Receptor	Coreceptor	Property	Chromosomal location
IL-1α	IL-1F1	IL-1RI	IL-1RAcP	Proinflammatory	2q14.1
IL-1β	IL-1F2	IL-1RI	IL-1RAcP	Proinflammatory	2q14.1
IL-1Ra	IL-1F3	IL-1RI	NA	Antagonist for IL-1α, IL-1β	2q14.1
IL-18	IL-1F4	IL-18Rα	IL-18Rβ	Proinflammatory	11q23.1
IL-36Ra	IL-1F5	IL-1Rrp2	NA	Antagonist for IL-36α, IL-36β, IL-36γ	2q14.1
IL-36α	IL-1F6	IL-1Rrp2	IL-1RAcP	Proinflammatory	2q14.1
IL-37	IL-1F7	Unknown	Unknown	Anti-inflammatory	2q14.1
IL-36β	IL-1F8	IL-1Rrp2	IL-1RAcP	Proinflammatory	2q14.1
IL-36γ	IL-1F9	IL-1Rrp2	IL-1RAcP	Proinflammatory	2q14.1
IL-38	IL-1F10	IL-1Rrp2	Unknown	Anti-inflammatory	2q14.1
IL-33	IL-1F11	ST2	IL-1RAcP	Th2 responses, proinflammatory	9p24.1

== Signaling ==
IL-1α and IL-1β bind to the same receptor molecule, which is called type I IL-1 receptor (IL-1RI). There is a third ligand of this receptor – the Interleukin 1 receptor antagonist (IL-1Ra), which does not activate downstream signaling, so it acts as an inhibitor of IL-1α and IL-1β signaling by competing with them for binding sites of the receptor.

IL-1α or IL-1β bind first to the first extracellular chain of IL-1RI, that recruits the IL-1 receptor accessory protein (IL-1RAcP), which serves as a coreceptor and is necessary for signal transduction and it is also needed for activation of IL-1RI by IL-18 and IL-33.

After the formation of receptor heterodimeric complex which is assembled by IL-1α or IL-1β, IL-1RI and IL-1RAcP, two intracellular adaptor proteins are assembled by conserved cytosolic regions called Toll- and IL-1R-like (TIR) domains. They are called the myeloid differentiation primary response gene 88 (MYD88) and interleukin-1 receptor-activated protein kinase (IRAK) 4. Phosphorylation of IRAK4 is followed by phosphorylation of IRAK1, IRAK2 and tumor necrosis factor receptor-associated factor (TRAF) 6. TRAF6 is a ubiquitin E3 ligase, that in association with ubiquitin-conjugating enzyme (ubiquitin E2 ligase) complex attaches K63-linked polyubiquitin chains to some of IL-1signaling intermediates, for instance TGF-β-activated protein kinase (TAK-1). That facilitates the association of TAK-1 with TRAF6 and with MEKK3. These signaling pathways lead to activation of many transcription factors, such as NF-κB, AP-1, c-Jun N-terminal kinase (JNK) and p38 MAPK.

IL-1α precursor and mature IL-1β lack a signal peptide which should direct them into the endoplasmic/Golgi-dependent secretion pathway and they are secreted by an unconventional protein secretion pathway, of which the mechanism and regulation are not known.

== Biological activity ==
IL-1 is intensely produced by tissue macrophages, monocytes, fibroblasts, and dendritic cells, but is also expressed by B lymphocytes, NK cells, microglia, and epithelial cells. They form an important part of the inflammatory response of the body against infection. These cytokines increase the expression of adhesion factors on endothelial cells to enable transmigration (also called diapedesis) of immunocompetent cells, such as phagocytes, lymphocytes and others, to sites of infection. They also affect the activity of the hypothalamus, the thermoregulatory center, which leads to a rise in body temperature (fever). That is why IL-1 is called an endogenous pyrogen. Besides fever, IL-1 also causes hyperalgesia (increased pain sensitivity), vasodilation and hypotension.

=== IL-1α ===
IL-1α is a "dual-function cytokine", which means it plays a role in the nucleus by affecting transcription, as well as its extracellular receptor-mediated effects as a classical cytokine. IL-33 also belongs in this group.

IL-1α is synthesized as a precursor protein and it is constitutively stored in the cytoplasm of cells of mesenchymal origin and in epithelial cells. In contrast, monocytes and macrophages do not contain preformed IL-1α precursors, but instead rely on de novo synthesis. The IL-1α precursor is processed to its mature 17-kDa form by a Ca2+-activated protease, calpain. Processing liberates the 16-kDa N-terminal propiece cleavage product (ppIL-1α), which contains a nuclear localization sequence (NLS), and translocates to the nucleus, functioning as a transcription factor. The precursor form of IL-1α, which has both the N-terminal and C-terminal receptor interacting domains, acts as a damage-associated molecular pattern (DAMP) molecule. DAMPs, also known as alarmins, are recognized by innate immunity cells by pattern recognition receptors (PRRs) and function as danger signals for the immune system. In short, DAMPs are released from stressed cells, which undergo necrosis or pyroptosis and their intracellular components are released into extracellular space. Because of misfolding and other oxidative changes of these molecules in the context of altered pH, they are recognized by the innate immune system as molecules that should not be in extracellular space. Cell stress could be due to infection, injury, ischemia, hypoxia, acidosis and complement lysis. The IL-33 precursor molecule acts in a similar way as a DAMP molecule.

Inflammatory responses in the absence of infection (such as ischemia) are only dependent on IL-1α signaling via the Interleukin-1 receptor (IL-1R), rather than TLRs signaling. IL-1α also stimulates transcription and secretion of IL-1β from monocytes, so the initiator of immune responses is likely IL-1α precursor by induction of neutrophil infiltration. IL-1β seems to be an amplifier of inflammation by recruitment of macrophages in the context of sterile inflammation.

=== IL-1β ===
IL-1β is synthesized as a precursor form protein only after stimulation, in contrast to IL-1α. Its expression is induced by transcription factor NF-κB after exposure of innate immune cells to alarmins. This occurs, for instance, after exposure of macrophages and dendritic cells to lipopolysaccharide (LPS), which binds to TLR4 and acts as pathogen-associated molecular pattern, which is another group of alarmins.

The synthesis of IL-1β precursor (and IL-18) is induced by stimulation of innate immune cells by Toll-like receptors (TLRs) or RIG-like receptors (RLRs), but to gain the ability to bind to IL-1 receptor, the IL-1β precursor has to be cleaved by a cysteine protease called caspase-1. Caspase-1 needs to be activated by a formation called the inflammasome which is mediated by cytoplasmic pattern recognition receptor signaling. So, the secretion of IL-1β needs these two steps and activation of different receptors to be activated. Under special circumstances IL-1β can be processed also by other proteases, like during high neutrophilic inflammation.

IL-18 is also synthesized as a precursor which is cleaved by caspase-1.

There are indications that IL-1, not least IL-1beta, is of importance for regulation energy metabolism. For instance, Leptin actions on food intake and body temperature are mediated by IL-1 at the level of the CNS. Moreover, lack of IL-1RI–mediated biological activity in IL-1 receptor knockout mice causes mature-onset obesity.

=== IL-1ra ===
IL-1ra is produced by monocytes, macrophages, neutrophils, fibroblasts, epithelial cells, Sertoli cells, microglia. IL-1ra is synthesized as a preprotein containing a classical 25 amino acid long signal sequence that allows secretion via the endoplasmic reticulum / Golgi apparatus. Mouse, rat and rabbit IL-1ra show 77, 75, and 78% sequence homology to human IL-1ra. L-1ra shows approximately 30% homology to IL-1β at the protein level. Several forms of IL-1ra have been identified: the 17 kDa form, called sIL-1ra (s = soluble) or also IL-1ra1. It contains the classical signal sequence and is a secreted form of IL-1ra. The other 2 forms, commonly referred to as icIL-1ra or IL-1ra2 and IL-1ra3, do not have a signal sequence, are not secreted, and remain strictly interacellular. The soluble form is produced by hepatocytes and regulated by pro-inflammatory cytokines (IL1-β and a combination of IL1-β and IL-6) and other acute phase proteins. The intracellular form was found in fibroblasts, monocytes, neutrophils, keratinocytes and bronchial epithelial cells. IL-1ra is an important regulator of IL-1-induced expression and physiological responses elicited by IL-1. IL-1ra functions as a competitive inhibitor of IL-1 receptor in vivo and in vitro. It counteracts the effects of both IL-1α and IL-1β. Upon binding of IL-1ra, the IL-1 receptor does not transmit a signal to the cell. IL-1ra inhibits the release of both IL-1α and IL-1β, IL-2 secretion, cell surface IL-2 receptor expression. It blocks the stimulation of prostaglandin E2 synthesis in synovial cells and thymocyte proliferation. It also inhibits the release of leukotriene B4 from monocytes after stimulation with bacterial lipopolysaccharides. It blocks insulin release from isolated pancreatic cells.

Polymorphism of this gene is associated with an increased risk of osteoporotic fractures. IL-1ra antagonist deficiency (DIRA) is a rare congenital disease. Affected children experience severe skin and bone inflammation, other organs such as the lungs may be affected. IL-1ra is used in the treatment of rheumatoid arthritis. It is commercially produced as a recombinant form of IL-1ra and is called anakinra.

=== IL-18 ===
IL-18 is known as a factor that induces the production of interferon gamma (IFN-γ). It is a pro-inflammatory cytokine that shares similar biological effects to IL-12 and structural forms with the IL-1 family. Together with IL-12 it mediates cellular immunity. It binds to the IL-18Rα receptor. It is produced by monocytes, macrophages, osteoblasts, keratinocytes. It is synthesized as an inactive precursor that is proteolytically cleaved to the active 18 kDa form. IL-18 stimulates IFN-γ production by T cells and NK cells. It acts either independently or synergizes with IL-12, which may lead to rapid activation of the monocyte / macrophage system. The combination of this cytokine and IL-12 inhibits IL-4 dependent production of IgE and IgG1 and, in turn, promotes IgG2 production by B cells. In addition to these physiological functions, IL-18 is involved in several serious inflammatory reactions. The amount of IL-18 receptor mRNA in the endometrium as well as the ratio of the amount of binding protein to interleukin is demonstrably increased in patients with endomyosis compared to individuals without endomyosis. IL-18 is also amplified in Hashimoto's thyroiditis. This interleukin has been shown to increase β amyloid production in neurons in Alzheimer's disease.

=== IL-33 ===
IL-33 is synthesized as a 31-kDa precursor form and binds the ST2 receptor and IL-1RAcP coreceptor, which stimulates signaling that activates transcription factors as NF-κB and ERK, p38 and JNK MAPKs. The signaling can be triggered by a precursor form of IL-33 in the same way as IL-1α precursor activates signaling through the IL-1 receptor. On the other hand, the mature forms IL-3395-270, IL-3399-270 and IL-33109-270, which are processed from a precursor by serine proteases cathepsin G and elastase, are even more potent activators of inflammatory responses. In contrast with IL-1, processing by caspases, like caspase-1, results in IL-33 inactivation.

IL-33 is a dual function cytokine. Besides its chromatin-associated function, it is constitutively expressed in healthy endothelial cells, because it acts as DAMPs after its release to extracellular space of cells in the context of immunologic not-silent cell death (necrosis or pyroptosis), and drives cytokine production in natural helper cells, nuocytes, Th2 lymphocytes, mast cells, basophils, eosinophils, invariant natural killer and natural killer T cells. It is involved in allergic and parasite-induced inflammatory responses.

=== IL-36α ===
IL-36α is expressed in spleen, lymph nodes, tonsils, bone marrow, B-cells. This member is unique in that it is additionally synthesized by T lymphocytes. It is most related to IL-37 and IL-36β.

=== IL-36β ===
IL-36β is expressed in the tonsils, bone marrow, heart, placenta, lung, testes, intestine, monocytes and B-lymphocytes. It is most similar to IL-36α (IL-1F6). Two alternative transcripts encoding the same protein have been described.

=== IL-36γ ===
IL-36γ is most produced by keratinocytes. It activates NF-κB via interleukin 1 receptor-like 2 (IL-1Rrp2) and is specifically inhibited by IL-36ra. Its production increases after IL-1β and TNF-α stimulation, but not after IL-18 or IFN-γ stimulation. IL-36γ plays an important role in skin immunity and inflammation. Expression is increased during chronic contact hypersensitivity, herpes simplex virus infection and psoriasis.

=== IL-36ra ===
IL-36ra is highly expressed by keratinocytes, in psoriatic skin, placenta, uterus, brain, kidneys, monocytes, B-lymphocytes and dendritic cells. IL-36ra is 155 amino acids long and lacks a signal sequence. IL-36ra shares with IL-1ra 52% homology in the amino acid sequence. IL-36ra acts as a non-specific inhibitor of inflammation and innate immunity. It inhibits IL-36α induced NF-κB activation.

=== IL-37 ===
IL-37 is expressed in most tissues. It is the first member of the IL-1 family to form homodimers. IL-37 non-specifically inhibits the inflammatory response and innate immunity. IL-1F7 has also been found in the nucleus where it can function as a nuclear factor. This cytokine may bind or may itself be a ligand of the IL-18 receptor (IL18R1 / IL-1Rrp). It binds to the interleukin 18 binding protein (IL18BP), forming a complex with the beta subunit of the IL-18 receptor (IL-1F4), thereby inhibiting its activity. 5 alternative transcripts encoding different IL-37 isoforms have been described.

=== IL-38 ===
IL-38 is expressed in the skin as well as in the tonsils. It regulates both innate and adaptive immunity. It binds to the soluble IL-1RI receptor. Two alternative transcripts encoding the same protein have been described.

== Cytokine-induced effector cytokine production ==
IL-33 has a role in so called cytokine-induced effector cytokine production, which means that a production of effector cytokines by differentiated T helper lymphocytes is cytokine dependent and can happen without antigen stimulation by T-cell receptor of these cells. IL-33 in combination with some STAT5 activators, such as IL-2, IL-7 or TSLP, up-regulates expression of its own receptor on already differentiated Th2 lymphocytes, because naive T helper cells nor Th1 nor Th17 populations do not have ST2 receptors. This up-regulation works as a positive feedback which causes even more strong activation of IL-33 dependent-signaling pathways in the lymphocyte. This up-regulation is directly controlled by GATA3 transcription factor. IL-33 combined with IL-2, IL-7 or TSLP also stimulates cell proliferation. The effector cytokine which is secreted from IL-33- and STAT5 activator-stimulated Th2 cells is IL-13, which is NF-κB dependent. IL-13 is very similar to IL-4 in amino acid sequence and structure. They also used the same type II IL-4 receptor to activate STAT6.

Similar functions have IL-1 to Th17 cells and IL-18 to Th1 lymphocytes. IL-1 combined with some STAT3 activators, such as IL-6, IL-21 or IL-23, which are important for Th17 lymphocytes differentiation, have similar positive feedback in Th17 cells just like IL-33 and STAT5 activators have in Th2 cells. They highly up-regulate expression of IL-1 receptor and RORγt on the surface of stimulated Th17 lymphocytes. The effector cytokines mediated by this signalization are IL-17A, IL-4 and IL-6. IL-18 with IL-12, which is a STAT4 activator, have similar effects on Th1 cells by up-regulating expression of IL-18R1 receptor and T-bet.

== IL-1 in disease and its clinical significance ==
IL-1 has a major role in neuroinflammation. During inflammation, there are increased levels of TNF and IL-1 in the brain, and their presence may cause the breakdown of the blood-brain barrier. Polymorphisms in IL-1 genes have been found to contribute to genetic susceptibility to some cancers, ankylosing spondylitis, and Graves' disease.

In terms of clinical use, because of its characterization as a hematopoietic factor, IL-1 was given to patients after bone marrow transplantation to improve the engraftment. But soon it was discovered that the patients were experiencing symptoms of systemic inflammation. Pharmacological blockade of these receptors was then sought in order to relieve symptoms. The endogenous IL-1 receptor antagonist (IL-1Ra), also known as anakinra, was tried in clinical trials to lessen systemic inflammation, but did not demonstrate a statistically significant difference from placebo.

Nowadays, the blockade of IL-1 activity (especially IL-1β) is a standard therapy for patients with autoimmune diseases or lymphomas. Anakinra (IL-1Ra) is FDA-approved as a therapy for patients with rheumatoid arthritis, because it reduces symptoms and slows joint destruction of this inflammatory disease. It has also been prescribed to patients with indolent or smoldering myeloma with a high risk of progression to multiple myeloma. In combination with other medication, IL-1Ra provides a significant increase in the number of years of progression-free disease in its recipients. The benefits of this treatment are the natural structure and no toxicity or gastrointestinal disturbances.
