= Interleukin 36 =

Group of cytokines

Interleukin 36, or IL-36, is a group of cytokines in the IL-1 family with pro-inflammatory effects. The role of IL-36 in inflammatory diseases is under investigation.

There are four members of the IL-36 family which bind to the IL-36 receptor (IL1RL2/IL-1Rrp2/IL-36 receptor dimer) with varying affinities. IL36A, IL36B, and IL36G are IL-36 receptor agonists. IL36RA is an IL-36 receptor antagonist, inhibiting IL-36R signaling. The agonists are known to activate NF-κB, mitogen-activated protein kinases, Erk1/2 and JNK through IL-36R/IL-1RAcP, which targets the IL-8 promotor and results in IL-6 secretion and induces various proinflammatory mediators. Binding of the IL-36R agonists to IL-1Rrp2 recruits IL-1RAcP, activating the signaling pathway. IL-36Ra binds to IL-36R, preventing the recruitment of IL-1RAcP.

== Function ==
IL-36 has been found to activate T cell proliferation and release of IL-2. Before the functions of the IL-36 cytokines were determined, they were named as derivatives of IL-1F; they were renamed to their current designations in 2010.

Due to their predominant expression in epithelial tissues, IL-36 cytokines are believed to play a significant role in the pathogenesis of skin diseases, especially that of psoriasis. IL-36 has also been linked to psoriatic arthritis, systemic lupus erythematosus, inflammatory bowel disease, ulcerative colitis, Crohn's disease, and Sjögren's syndrome.

IL-36 must be cleaved at the N-terminus to become active, probable enzymes mediating the activation could be neutrophil granule-derived proteases, elastase, and cathepsin G, although they may activate the cytokines differentially.

IL-36 is expressed by many cells types, most predominantly keratinocytes, respiratory epithelium, various nervous tissue, and monocytes.

== Genes and expression ==
The genes encoding for the IL-36 cytokines are found on chromosome 2q14.1. All three are located in a cluster with other members of IL-1 family and the gene order from centromere to telomere is IL-1A-IL-1B-IL-37-IL-36G-IL-36A-IL-36B-IL-36RN-IL1F10-IL-1RN, and only IL-1A, IL-1B and IL-36B. All of them probably arose from a common ancestral gene, which is most likely a primordial IL-1 receptor antagonist gene.

All three genes are mainly expressed in keratinocytes, bronchial epithelium, brain tissue, and monocytes/macrophages. In the epidermis IL-36 cytokine expression is limited to granular layer keratinocytes with little to no expression in basal layer keratinocytes.

IL-36Ra is constitutively expressed in keratinocytes, whereas IL-36γ expression in keratinocytes is rapidly induced after stimulation with TNF or PMA (Phorbol 12-myristate 13-acetate).

== Clinical significance ==
IL-36-alpha functions primarily in skin and demonstrates increased expression in psoriasis. In addition, decreased expression of this gene has been linked to a poor prognosis in both hepatocellular carcinoma and colorectal cancer patients.

IL-36 cytokines may play a regulatory role in the pathogenesis of inflammatory disorders such as folliculitis and eosinophilic pustular folliculitis. In addition, in acute generalized exanthematous pustulosis, IL-36 (mainly IL-36 gamma) was overexpressed in skin lesions.

Studies revealed that T cells were sufficient to cause skin inflammation after Staphylococcus aureus exposure on mice, mediating the skin inflammation via IL-36-controlled, IL-17-dependent T cell responses.

IL-36 is significantly involved in the pathogenesis of psoriasis leading to it being targeted therapeutically. Human psoriatic skin plaques displayed elevated IL-36beta. In addition, It was found that serum IL-36 levels are higher in patients with psoriasis vulgaris and its levels positively correlate with disease activity, suggesting that serum IL-36 levels might serve as useful biomarkers in patients with psoriasis.
