= Interleukin 40 =

Mammalian cytokine

C17orf99

Identifiers
- Aliases: C17orf99, UNQ464, chromosome 17 open reading frame 99, IL-40, IL40, Interleukin 40
- External IDs: MGI: 1924977; HomoloGene: 90660; GeneCards: C17orf99; OMA:C17orf99 - orthologs

Gene location (Human)
Chr.	Chromosome 17 (human)
Band	17q25.3	Start	78,146,385 bp
Band	17q25.3	End	78,166,297 bp

Gene location (Mouse)
Chr.	Chromosome 11 (mouse)
Band	11|11 E2	Start	117,688,486 bp
Band	11|11 E2	End	117,698,127 bp
RNA expression pattern
Bgee	Human / Mouse (ortholog); Top expressed in: epithelium of colon; buccal mucosa cell; trabecular bone; oocyte; secondary oocyte; bone marrow; bone marrow cell; amniotic fluid; blood; granulocyte / Top expressed in: embryo; yolk sac; morula; bone marrow; human fetus; tail of embryo; spleen; ureter; stomach; right kidney; More reference expression data
BioGPS	n/a
Gene ontology
Molecular function	cytokine activity
Cellular component	extracellular region; extracellular space
Biological process	mature B cell differentiation involved in immune response; positive regulation of immunoglobulin production in mucosal tissue; adaptive immune response; immune system process; regulation of signaling receptor activity; signal transduction
Sources:Amigo / QuickGO
Orthologs
Species	Human	Mouse
Entrez	100141515	77727
Ensembl	ENSG00000187997	ENSMUSG00000025573
UniProt	Q6UX52	Q9CX63
RefSeq (mRNA)	NM_001163075	NM_029964
RefSeq (protein)	NP_001156547	NP_084240
Location (UCSC)	Chr 17: 78.15 – 78.17 Mb	Chr 11: 117.69 – 117.7 Mb
PubMed search
- Wikidata
View/Edit Human	View/Edit Mouse

Interleukin 40 (IL-40), also known with other name C17orf99, is a protein belonging to a group of cytokines called interleukins. It is encoded by a gene that does not belong to any cytokine superfamily. This cytokine is produced primarily by human expression tissues such as bone marrow and fetal liver, and its expression can be also induced in peripheral B cells after activation. IL-40 is involved in immunoglobulin A (IgA) production, and plays an important role in humoral immune responses and B cell homeostasis and development.

== Discovery, genes and expression ==
In October 2017, an article was published concerning a previously uncharacterized gene C17orf99 (chromosome 17 open reading frame 99) which is localized on chromosome 17 (17q25.3). This gene encodes a polypeptide chain with 265 amino acids long sequence (including a 20-aa signal peptide), which further determines the mature small secreted protein with predicted molecular weight of approximately 27 kDa.

Due to its unique sequence, IL-40 is not structurally related to any other cytokine family, suggesting that it has a distinct evolutionary history. Besides IL-40, there are few cytokines that also do not belong to any cytokine superfamily, namely: IL-32 and IL-34.

Since this protein is primarily secreted after B cell activation, it was assumed that the gene product C17orf99 would affect the immune system, however, the precise effects require further investigation. Testing was conducted on mice with targeted chromosomal deletion. The novel cytokine that resulted from the study was designated IL-40 and is the most recent in a line of cytokines found.

Only mammalian genomes contain C17orf99, which is expressed by B cells that have been activated, however the expression profile of IL-40 is similar in two species (mouse and human) and is 72% conserved at the amino acid level between them.

== Function ==
IL-40 has been found is crucial for humoral immune reactions, synthesis of IgA and might be helpful for the growth of B cells, B cell maturation in the BM and in the periphery and their homeostasis. Importantly, human activated B cells and some B cell lymphomas express IL-40 as well. The major producing cells are B cells, bone marrow stroma cells.

IL-40 is associated with lactation and affects initiation of IgA production in the mammary gland. Through the interaction of mucosal immunity and microbiota, the composition of the gut microbiome in mice is also correlated with expression of cytokine IL-40.

Cytokines like IL-4 and TGF-1 can increase the amount of IL-40.

Latter findings imply that it might be related to pathophysiological and inflammatory aspects of diseases.

== Clinical significance ==
IL-40 cytokine may play a regulatory role in the pathogenesis of inflammatory diseases such as rheumatoid arthritis, ankylosing spondylitis, which is a common chronic inflammatory autoimmune rheumatic disorder, several cell lines of human diffuse large B cell lymphoma and also can play some role in autoimmune hepatitis as discriminating autoantigens.

In a disorder called ankylosing spondylitis (AS), it has been discovered to be connected with elevated circulating levels of pro-inflammatory cytokines and additionally, it has been revealed that anti-inflammatory cytokines are crucial for AS immunological homeostasis such as interleukin (IL)-1 family, in that it includes both pro-inflammatory (IL-1α, IL-1β, IL-18, IL-33, and IL-36) and anti-inflammatory (IL-37 and IL-38) cytokines. It has been revealed that IL-40 was significantly higher in AS patients than in controls, and it can be used as biomarker with other cytokines in serum of patients.

=== Rheumatoid Arthritis (RA) ===
Given the association of IL-40 with B cells homeostasis and the crucial role of B cells in autoimmunity, it only makes sense to focus on this cytokine during studies of rheumatoid arthritis or autoimmunity in general. Exploring IL-40 as a potential biomarker for earlier diagnosis of these diseases could lead to improvement in therapeutic outcomes. Additionally, there is potential to leverage IL-40 in therapeutic interventions.

The expression of IL-40, an interleukin involved in immune regulation, has been found to be elevated in the synovial fluid of patients with rheumatoid arthritis. RA is characterized by autoimmune reactions primarily targeting the synovial membrane, making the synovial fluid a valuable medium for studying molecules that interact with or originate from this membrane. A comparison of IL-40 expression in synovial tissue between RA and osteoarthritis (OA) patients reveals significantly higher levels in RA patients, particularly within the inflammatory infiltrate. Within the synovial tissue of RA patients, IL-40 is observed to co-localize with various immune cells such as macrophages, B cells, T cells, and neutrophils. Neutrophils, in particular, have been identified as a known source of IL-40 in the context of RA.

In addition to its presence in the synovial fluid, IL-40 levels are elevated in the serum of RA patients compared to those with OA. However, the concentration of IL-40 is notably higher in the local inflammatory sites, specifically the RA synovial fluid, compared to levels of IL-40 in serum.

IL-40 in RA patients is correlated with disease activity and the levels of autoantibodies. Furthermore, during the early stages of RA, IL-40 is elevated in the serum compared to healthy individuals. However, after three months of conventional therapy, IL-40 levels in the early stages of RA can be normalized. Studies have shown that elevated IL-40 levels in RA decrease following B-cell depletion therapy, as demonstrated by the effects of rituximab on serum IL-40 after 16 and 24 weeks of therapy

Serum levels of IL-40 in early RA correlate with the levels of autoantibodies and NETosis markers. These correlations become evident when neutrophils are stimulated to undergo NETosis or when they are exposed to inflammatory factors like IL-1β, IL-8, tumor necrosis factor, or lipopolysaccharide. Following the induction of NETosis or exposure to inflammatory cytokines, neutrophils showed enhanced secretion of IL-40, indicating their potential involvement in the heightened IL-40 levels observed among early RA patients.

=== Ankylosing Spondylitis (AS) ===
For ankylosing spondylitis (AS) IL-40 has a potential relevance as a biomarker. The levels of IL-40 are significantly higher in the serum of AS patients in comparison with healthy controls (HCs). IL-40 might have excellent diagnostic performance, suggesting its potential as a biomarker for AS susceptibility. IL-40 levels were upregulated in serum of AS patients regardless of age, disease duration, disease activity or HLA-B27. This observation is relevant to AS since it is suggested that the gut microbiota plays a role in the development of the condition.

=== Sjögren syndrome ===
Recently, an implication of IL-40 in the pathogenesis of primary Sjögren syndrome (pSS) and pSS-associated lymphoma was investigated. Overexpression of IL-40 was demonstrated in the salivary glands of patients with pSS, particularly in lymphocytic infiltrates and ductal epithelial cells, when compared to non-Sjögren's syndrome patients (nSS). IL-40 was also up-regulated in patients with pSS-associated lymphoma in comparison to nSS. The expression of IL-40 was associated with the degree of inflammatory infiltrate in the salivary glands, which suggests a potential role of IL-40 in driving the inflammatory response. The tissue expression of IL-40 correlated with the expression levels of IL-4 and TGF-β.

In comparison to nSS patients, CD19+ B lymphocytes were the major source of IL-40 in the lymphatic-infiltrated glands of pSS patients.

Furthermore, pSS patients had an expanded population of CD19+IL-40+ B cells in peripheral blood mononuclear cells compared to HCs. In addition, IL-40 was elevated in the serum of patients with pSS compared to nSS and significantly correlated with the disease activity score EULAR Sjögren's Syndrome Disease Activity Index. (citace) Moreover, a positive association was found between IL-40 levels and anti-SSA (Sjögren Syndrome related antigen A) and immunoglobulin (Ig) levels. In in vitro conditions, recombinant IL-40 significantly enhanced the expression of proinflacmmatory cytokines in T cells and IFN-γ production by B cells, both isolated from pSS patients. Moreover, recombinant IL-40 stimulated NETosis in neutrophils from pSS patients.
