= Interleukin-38 =

InterPro Family

Interleukin-38 (IL-38) is a member of the interleukin-1 (IL-1) family and the interleukin-36 (IL-36) subfamily. It is important for the inflammation and host defense. This cytokine is named IL-1F10 in humans and has similar three dimensional structure as IL-1 receptor antagonist (IL-1Ra). The organisation of IL-1F10 gene is conserved with other members of IL-1 family within chromosome 2q13. IL-38 is produced by mammalian cells may bind the IL-1 receptor type I. It is expressed in basal epithelia of skin, in proliferating B cells of the tonsil, in spleen and other tissues. This cytokine is playing important role in regulation of innate and adaptive immunity.

== Discovery ==
IL-38 probably originated from a common ancestral gene - an ancient IL-1RN gene. This cytokine has 41% homology with IL-1Ra and 43% homology with IL-36Ra. IL-38 is expressed in skin, spleen, tonsil, thymus, heart, placenta and fetal liver. In tissues which do not play a special role in immune response, IL-38 is expressed in low quantity similar to other members of the IL-1 family. In disease setting, specially when the activation of inflammatory response is dysregulated, the expression of IL-38 is changed. For example, in case of spondylitis ankylopoetica, cardiovascular disease, rheumatoid arthritis or hidradenitis suppurativa.

== Processing and signaling ==
According to consensus of cleaving site of IL-1 family, it is predicted that two amino acids (AA) should be removed to generate a processed 3-152AA IL-38 protein. The protease which cleaves IL-38 is still unknown as well as it is still not known which form of IL-38 is the natural variant present in the human body. It was reported that 20-152AA IL-38 form has increased biological activity.

IL-38 has non-characteristic dose-response curve and it binds to IL-36R (IL-1R6). This cytokine is blocking Candida-induced interleukin-17 (IL-17) response better in low concentration than in higher concentration even if induction of cytokine is not blocked. So it is possible that IL-38 released by apoptotic cells can bind to the Three Immunoglobulin Domain-containing IL-1 receptor-related 2 (TIGIRR-2, gene name IL1RAPL1, also known as IL-1R9) and IL-38 will have in this case an antagonistic effect on induction of inflammatory cytokine. It is possible that IL-38 would be first ligand of TIGIRR-2, a former orphan receptor of the IL-1 Family.

== Role in disease ==
Studies showed that IL-38 could play an important role in rheumatic diseases. IL-38 is also one of the five proteins which are related with C-reactive protein (CRP) levels in the serum. The association of IL-38 with CRP could mean that IL-38 will play role also in inflammatory diseases as cardiovascular disease.

== Function ==
The observation of knockdown of IL-38 with siRNA in peripheral blood mononuclear cells shows that production of interleukin-6 (IL-6), APRIL and CCL-2 were increased in response to TLR ligands, so IL-38 acted like antagonist in this case. There are also studies which show agonistic effect. In one study was compared the function of full-length IL-38 and truncated IL-38 and showed that high concentrations of the truncated IL-38 decreased production of IL-6 in response to interleukin-1β (IL-1β) in human macrophages, while full-length form increased IL-6 in the same concentrations. So IL-38 could have agonistic and also antagonistic effects which depend on processing and concentration.

Also when spontaneous murine model of systemic lupus erythematosus (SLE) was treated with recombinant IL-38, mice had less symptoms like proteinuria and skin lesions. Also serum levels of IL-17 and interleukin-22 were lower in these mice what approves in vitro observation that IL-38 could inhibit Th17 responses. Patients with SLE had higher concentrations of IL-38 in the serum than healthy patients and also patients with active disease had higher concentrations of IL-38 in the serum than patients with inactive form.

Sjogren's disease is disease related to SLE. Biopsy of gland of patients with primary Sjogren's disease shows that the expression of IL-38 was increased here. For modulation of this disease is important axis of IL-36. IL-38 is probably antagonist of IL-36 signaling similar as IL-36Ra what can play an important role in the pathogenesis of this autoimmune disease.

IL-38 was found also in the synovium of patients with rheumatoid arthritis and as well in mice with collagen-induced arthritis (CIA). IL-38 concentrations correlated with IL-1β. The overexpression of IL-38 in murine model of arthritis and serum transfer-induced arthritis ameliorate these diseases but not in case of antigen-induced arthritis. TNF production and IL-17 responses were decreased in these models. These data shows that IL-38 could have anti-inflammatory properties in rheumatoid arthritis and probably could be use in a therapeutic strategy.
