= 6-Formylindolo(3,2-b)carbazole =

6-Formylindolo[3,2-b]carbazole

Names
- Preferred IUPAC name 5,11-Dihydroindolo[3,2-b]carbazole-6-carbaldehyde
- Other names 6-Formylindolo[3,2-b]carbazole; FICZ

Identifiers
CAS Number	229020-82-0
3D model (JSmol)	Interactive image
ChEBI	CHEBI:94466
ChEMBL	ChEMBL472031
ChemSpider	1793
PubChem CID	1863
CompTox Dashboard (EPA)	DTXSID30274338
- InChI: InChI=1S/C19H12N2O/c22-10-14-18-12-6-2-4-8-16(12)20-17(18)9-13-11-5-1-3-7-15(11)21-19(13)14/h1-10,20-21H Key: ZUDXFBWDXVNRKF-UHFFFAOYSA-N
- SMILES: C1=CC=C2C(=C1)C3=CC4=C(C5=CC=CC=C5N4)C(=C3N2)C=O

Properties
Chemical formula	C_{19}H_{12}N_{2}O
Molar mass	284.318 g·mol^{−1}
- Except where otherwise noted, data are given for materials in their standard state (at 25 °C [77 °F], 100 kPa). Infobox references

6-Formylindolo[3,2-b]carbazole (FICZ) is a chemical compound with the molecular formula C_{19}H_{12}N_{2}O. It is a nitrogen heterocycle, having an extremely high affinity (K_{d} = 7 × 10^{−11}M) for binding to the aryl hydrocarbon receptor (AHR).

It was originally identified as a photooxygenated derivative of the amino acid tryptophan and suggested to be the endogenous ligand of the AHR. Later, also enzymatic formation of FICZ was shown.

== Occurrence ==
FICZ can be found in batches of tryptophan (Trp) and in any solution, including cell culture media, containing Trp, especially if exposed to ultraviolet light or visible light. In human keratinocytes (HaCaT cells) grown in Trp-enriched medium and then irradiated with UVB formation of intracellular FICZ could also be demonstrated. Similarly, FICZ has been identified and quantified in Jurkat cells grown in L-Trp enriched medium. FICZ was first identified in humans as sulfoconjugates, a type of metabolites of FICZ, by use of liquid chromatography–mass spectrometry, (LC/MS/MS). FICZ has been identified in the skin of persons with the disease vitiligo, and in extracts of skin originating from patients with the Malassezia-associated diseases seborrhoeic dermatitis (SD) or pityriasis versicolor (PV). Malassezia yeasts are commensal microorganisms found on the skin of many animals including humans. When the yeast stain Malassezia furfur is cultured on agar containing Trp as the only nitrogen source it produces FICZ and a variety of other indole derivatives . The gastrointestinal tract is a rich source of microorganisms and a favorable environment for the formation of indoles and indole derivatives. Although FICZ itself has not been convincingly identified in the mouse colon, the precursors of FICZ e.g. indole-3-pyruvate, indole-3-acetaldehyde (I3A), and tryptamine, have been found.

== Biosynthesis and mechanisms of formation ==
In addition to the light- or H_{2}O_{2}-induced formation of FICZ, a number of other enzymatic pathways have been identified to convert Trp to FICZ via the precursor I3A. Oxidative deamination of Trp by aromatic amino acid aminotransferases (ArAT) or L-amino oxidases (LAAO), one of which is the IL4-inducible enzyme IL4I1, converts Trp to indole-3-pyruvate, which after decarboxylation yields I3A. The enzyme aromatic L-amino acid decarboxylase (AADC) yields tryptamine via decarboxylation of Trp. Tryptamine can be oxidatively deaminated by monoamine oxidase (MAO-A and B) to produce I3A. Post incubation after deamination of the reaction mixture in the absence of an active enzyme generated FICZ and its oxidation product indolo[3,2-b]carbazole-6-carboxylic acid (CICZ). These non-enzymatic reactions were favored by low pH or increased temperature.

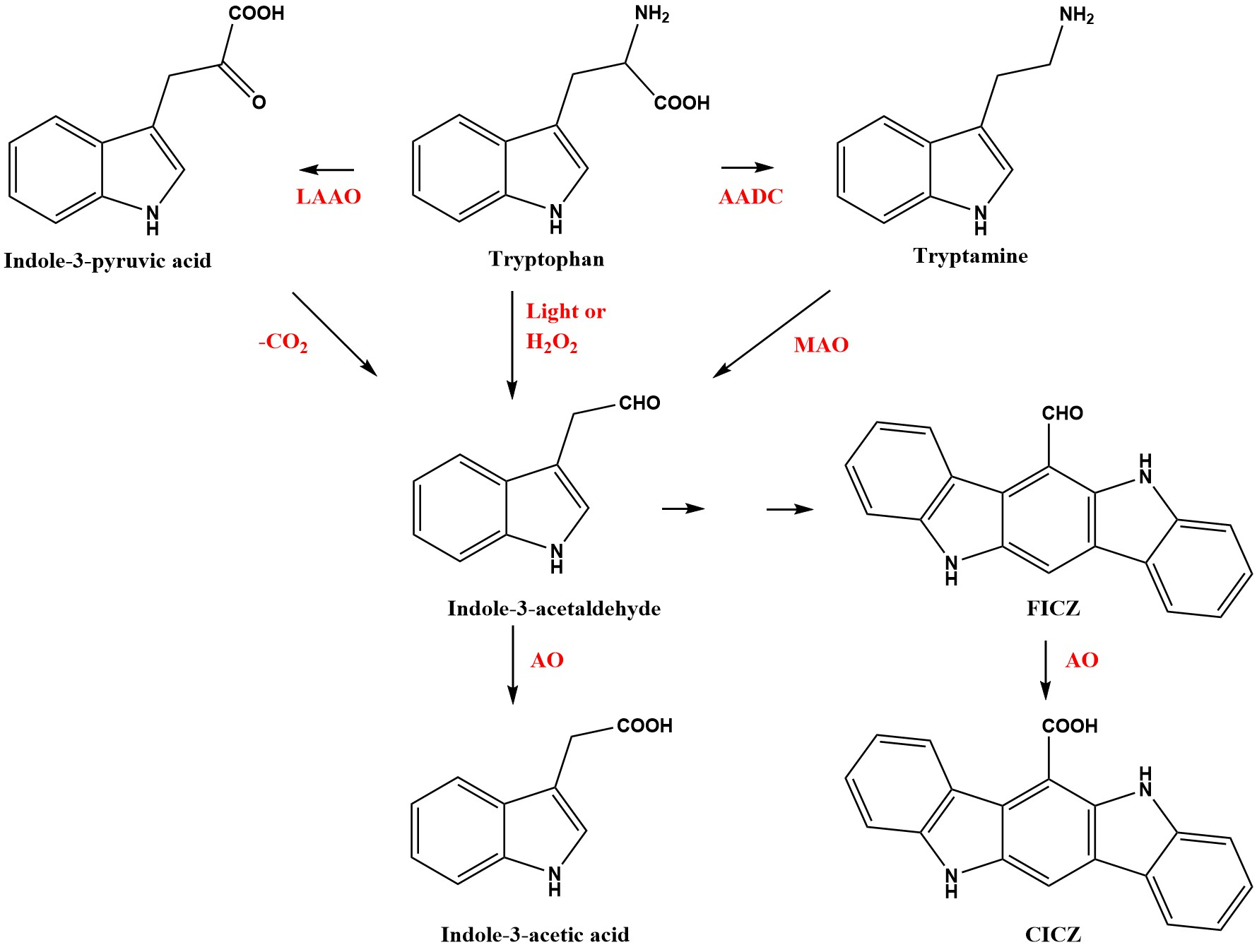
This scheme shows three different biosynthesis pathways generating the high affinity endogenous AHR ligand 6-formylindolo(3,2-b)carbazole FICZ

== Chemical syntheses ==
The indolo[3,2-b]carbazoles have been intensely studied as synthetic targets due to their diverse biological effects and numerous applications in materials chemistry. The double Fischer indolization for the synthesis of the parent system indolo[3,2-b]carbazole was first reported by Robinson 1963 and has since been applied for the synthesis of FICZ and related structures. A more practical and gram-scale synthesis of FICZ has been reported using readily available and commercially obtainable starting materials such as 1-(phenylsulfonyl)-1H-indole and 1-(phenylsulfonyl)-1H-indole-3-carbaldehyde. In order to reach gram amounts in the multistep synthesis of this low solubility ring-closed carbazole (FICZ) the final purification by column chromatography was replaced by a crystallization step instead.

== AHR-binding and gene induction ==
When the high-affinity AHR ligand FICZ binds to the receptor, which is a ligand dependent transcription factor, activation of many target genes takes place. The most well-studied of these target genes is the cytochrome P450 (CYP) 1A1. The CYPs are a superfamily of enzymes involved in the metabolism of a large number of both endogenous and exogenous compounds. The first chemical compound to be recognized as a high affinity AHR ligand was 2,3,7,8-tetrachlorodibenzo-p-dioxin (TCDD). The CYP-induction by TCDD is sustained while the induction by FICZ is transient because of its rapid metabolic degradation by CYP1A1.

== Metabolism ==
In the first analyses of the metabolism of FICZ, human recombinant CYP1A1 enzyme and S9 fractions prepared from rat liver and mouse Hepa-1 cells were used. Three HPLC fractions representing FICZ metabolites were occurring with time in the treated S9 derived from the wild type cells while no metabolites were detected in the S9 from CYP1A1-deficient cells. In the further analyses of the CYP1A1 derived metabolites two monohydroxylated FICZ metabolites (2- and 8-hydroxyindolo[3,2-b]carbazole-6-carboxaldehyde) and three dihydroxylated metabolites (2,8-, 2,10-, and 4,8-dihydroxyindolo[3,2-b]carbazole-6-carboxaldehyde) were identified by LC-MS and nuclear magnetic resonance spectroscopy (NMR spectroscopy) and the chemical structure of the metabolites were confirmed by chemical analyses. Kinetic studies using human recombinant CYP1A1, -1A2, and -1B1 expressed in E. coli showed that the catalytic efficiencies (specificity constant k_{cat}/K_{m}) were 5–50-fold higher for FICZ than for the standard substrates 7-ethoxyresorufin and 7-metoxyresorufin and at least 5000-fold higher compared with the hydroxylation of estrogens. The catalytic efficiency for FICZ as a CYP1A1 substrate (k_{cat}/K_{m} of 8.1×10^{7} M^{−1} s^{−1}) is close to the limit of diffusion and thus FICZ is an excellent CYP1A1 substrate, but is also a very good substrate for CYP1A2 and CYP1B1. The mono- and di-hydroxylated metabolites of FICZ are subject to further metabolic changes to glucuronide- and sulfate-conjugates. Sulfotransferase (SULT)-catalyzed reactions resulted in a more pronounced reduction of the hydroxylated FICZ metabolites than the glucuronidation. Further studies using human recombinant SULTs showed that SULT1A1, -1A2, -1B1, and -1E1 exhibited high catalytic efficiencies and 2-hydroxylated FICZ was more efficiently conjugated than the 8-hydroxylated FICZ. With a k_{cat}/K_{m} of 1.1×10^{7} M^{−1} s^{−1} with 2-OH-FICZ as substrate SULT1A2 exhibited a higher value than for any other substrate. Also dihydroxylated FICZ metabolites are converted to disulfuric acid esters but at a slower rate with intermediate formation of monosulfoconjugates, one of which was identified in human urine.

== The FICZ/AHR/CYP1A1 feedback loop ==
Already in the 1980s Nebert and coworkers proposed that a feedback loop involving an endogenous AHR ligand that is also a substrate for CYP1A1 regulates this signaling. FICZ inhibits CYP1A1 activity, but the inhibition is transient since FICZ is such an exceptionally good substrate for the CYP1A1 enzyme and thereby generates a regulatory AHR feedback loop. There are several substances, both exogenous and endogenous, which can inhibit CYP1A1 and indirectly leading to an accumulation of FICZ in the cell and a subsequent activation of the AHR and induction of CYP1A1. This feedback system is essential for the physiological function of the AHR signaling, since the AHR regulates the balance between the quiescence and proliferation of a large number of cells, such as intra-thymic progenitor cells, as well as hematopoietic, pulmonary, and neuro-epithelial stem cells.

== Physiological functions mediated by FICZ ==
=== Self-renewal and differentiation of stem/progenitor cells ===
The AHR seems to play important roles in normal embryonic development and reversible repression of the receptor is essential for the maintenance of the pluripotency of embryonic stem cells (ESC). It has been shown that the expansion of early progenitor murine hematopoietic stem cells is promoted by down-regulation of AHR signaling through the RNA-binding protein Musashi-2 and 200 nM FICZ reversed this effect. Furthermore, the expansion of human induced pluripotent stem cells (iPSC) was enhanced by the AHR inhibitor CH223191. In contrast, by applying a novel, pluripotent stem-cell-based in vitro culture system, it was demonstrated that the potent AhR ligand FICZ resulted in an exponential expansion (600-fold increase) of iPSC-derived hematopoietic progenitor cell (HP) populations. Furthermore, FICZ treatment for extended periods (60 days) resulted in a progressive erythroid specification and maturation of the HP cells. Various effects of the AHR and FICZ in cancer cells and cancer stem cells (CSCs) have also been described.

=== Immune responses ===
The AHR is involved in the regulation of T helper 17 cell (Th17) and regulatory T cell (Treg) differentiation, which is of importance for the treatment of autoimmunity, infections and cancer. AHR activation by FICZ can promote the development of Th17 cells causing inflammation and autoimmunity, but also promote an expansion of the Treg cell population and thereby stimulate immunosuppressive activities. Taking rapid metabolic degradation of FICZ into account, there seems to be no intrinsic difference in the effects of FICZ and TCDD on T cell differentiation and T cell-mediated adaptive immune responses as originally reported. Similarly, FICZ can stimulate or inhibit cytokine production and the maturation and homeostasis of mast cells in vitro, as well as anaphylactic responses in vivo, depending on the dose and timing of exposure.

=== Immune barrier homeostases ===
The AHR is highly expressed in cells of the immune barrier organs, such as skin, lung, gut, and mucosal epithelia, as well as in the placenta. AHR-deficient mice have fewer intestinal innate lymphoid cells (ILCs), which are the dominant source of interleukin 22 (IL-22) and they do not survive infection by the intestinal pathogen Citrobacter rodentium. The same authors reported that in wild-type mice, FICZ increased the production of IL-22 by the ILCs. In another study, daily i.p. injections of 100 μg × kg^{−1} FICZ to adult mice dramatically reduced their mortality following infection with the intestinal pathogen Listeria monocytogenes. Stockinger and co-workers showed that efficient metabolic clearance of FICZ in mice that overexpress Cyp1a1 in the gut epithelium led to a pseudo-AHR-deficient state and when infected with Citrobacter rodentium, these animals exhibited markedly reduced numbers of group 3 ILCs and Th17 cells and succumbed rapidly. Conversely, in mice lacking CYP1A1, or when CYP1A1 was inhibited, increased protection against intestinal infection was observed. The composition of the murine commensal microbiota influences susceptibility to gastrointestinal infections and induced colitis and specific components of this microbiota promote the production of AHR ligands resulting in protection against intestinal damage induced by dextran sulfate sodium (DSS). Monteleone and co-workers reported that mice injected with FICZ were protected against colitis in several experimental models of colitis. Moreover, administration of anti-IL-22 prevented the anti-inflammatory effect of FICZ, demonstrating that the therapeutic effect of FICZ at least is partially mediated by IL-22. The effect of AhR ligands in reversing inflammatory responses was also demonstrated in a clinical setting. FICZ treatment of lamina propria mononuclear cells from Crohn's disease patients resulted in decreased IFN-γ expression and up-regulation of IL-22. Lamas and co-workers showed that mice with dysbiotic microbiota due to their lack of the caspase recruitment domain 9 (CARD9) produced lower levels of endogenous AHR agonists and recovered more poorly from DSS-induced colitis. When 1 μg FICZ was injected i.p. one day after DSS administration, the severity of colitis in these animals was reduced significantly. Also, the defective colonic expression of IL-22 and genes coding for antimicrobial proteins in Card9 KO mice could be reversed by FICZ.

FICZ seems also to be involved in the physiological regulation of Th2-mediated immunity in the lung. In vitro, FICZ markedly inhibited the lipopolysaccharide- and ovalbumin-induced proliferation of T cells. FICZ likewise suppressed pulmonary Th2-type cytokine production in a mouse model of ovalbumin-induced allergic asthma.

Dynamic AHR signaling plays key roles in skin immunity. When full-thickness biopsies from the lesional skin of patients with psoriasis were exposed to FICZ, 29 genes belonging to the psoriasis transcriptome were down-regulated. A later murine study confirmed that FICZ decreased IL-17 expression and lessened the severity of psoriasis. Similarly, FICZ and AHR may be involved in the etiology of cutaneous systemic lupus erythematosus and atopic dermatitis. There are also evidence for an important physiological role for FICZ in the expression of IL-22 in the skin. The uptake of Trp and intracellular accumulation of FICZ in skin γδ T cells is regulated by the activation marker CD69 in combination with the aromatic-amino-acid-transporter complex LAT1-CD98. These results revealed the importance of Trp uptake for AHR dependent secretion of IL-22 by γδ T cells during the development of psoriasis.

== The toxicity of FICZ ==
High levels of FICZ can exert ROS-dependent toxicity, whereas low levels can transiently elevate local levels of ROS/Ca^{2+}, thereby promoting cellular adaptation, survival, and proliferation. FICZ has proven to be potently embryotoxic toward fish and birds. Zebrafish embryos demonstrated a dramatically increased mortality and severe toxicity of FICZ when CYP1A1 was inhibited. FICZ is also an endogenous chromophore that at nanomolar concentrations potentiate photooxidative stress. FICZ phototoxicity can be a valuable tool in elimination of skin cancer cells
