= Interleukin 36 receptor antagonist =

Protein-coding gene in the species Homo sapiens

IL36RN
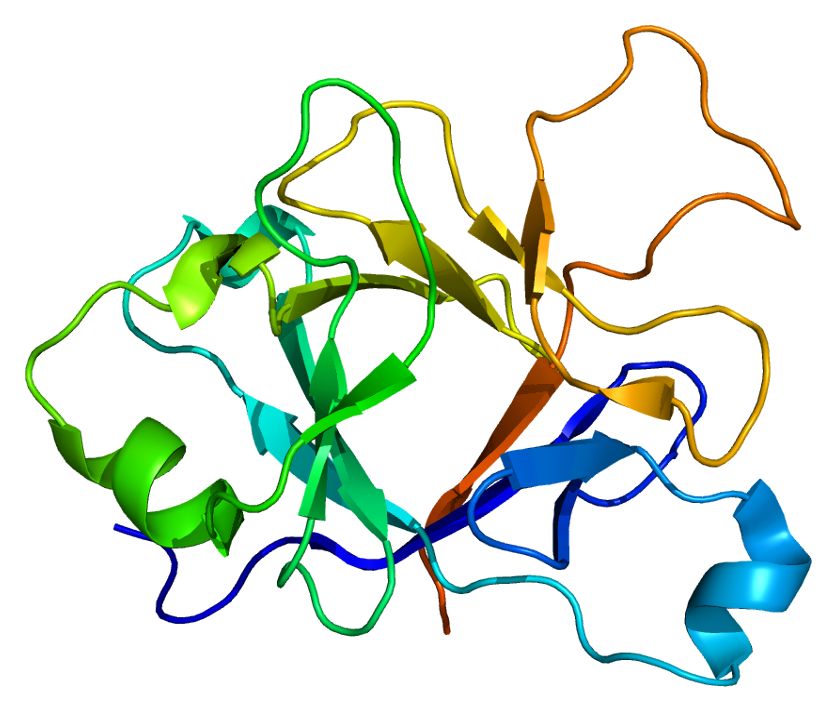

Identifiers
- Aliases: IL36RN, FIL1, FIL1(DELTA), FIL1D, IL1F5, IL1HY1, IL1L1, IL1RP3, IL36RA, PSORP, IL-36Ra, PSORS14, interleukin 36 receptor antagonist
- External IDs: OMIM: 605507; MGI: 1859325; GeneCards: IL36RN
Available structures
PDB	Ortholog search: PDBe RCSB
PDB	List of PDB id codes 4P0J, 4P0K, 4P0L

Gene location (Human)
Chr.	Chromosome 2 (human)
Band	2q14.1	Start	113,058,638 bp
Band	2q14.1	End	113,065,382 bp

Gene location (Mouse)
Chr.	Chromosome 2 (mouse)
Band	2 A3|2 16.31 cM	Start	24,166,966 bp
Band	2 A3|2 16.31 cM	End	24,173,438 bp
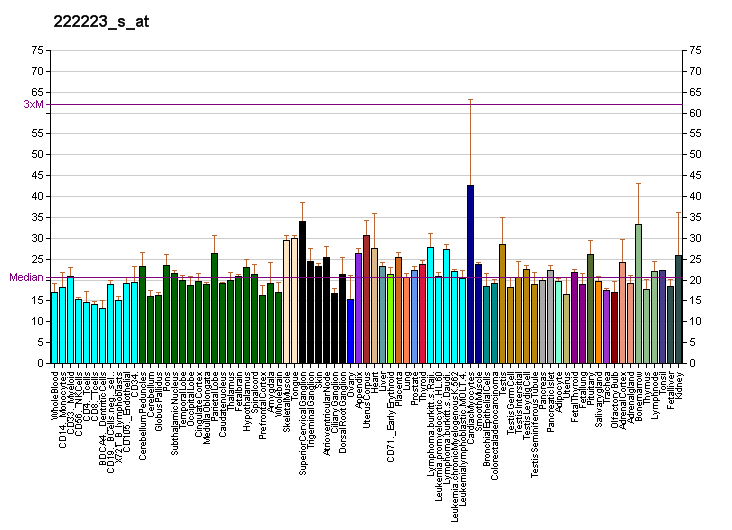
RNA expression pattern
Bgee	Human / Mouse (ortholog); Top expressed in: amniotic fluid; skin of arm; gums; gingival epithelium; skin of leg; skin of abdomen; cervix epithelium; oral cavity; buccal mucosa cell; cartilage tissue / Top expressed in: lip; esophagus; skin of external ear; skin of back; umbilical cord; skin of abdomen; parotid gland; superior surface of tongue; lumbar subsegment of spinal cord; epidermis; More reference expression data
BioGPS	More reference expression data
Gene ontology
Molecular function	cytokine activity; protein binding; interleukin-1 receptor binding; interleukin-1 receptor antagonist activity
Cellular component	extracellular space; extracellular region
Biological process	negative regulation of interleukin-6 production; negative regulation of cytokine-mediated signaling pathway; innate immune response; negative regulation of interleukin-17 production; antifungal humoral response; immune system process; inflammatory response; immune response; regulation of signaling receptor activity; cytokine-mediated signaling pathway; neutrophil chemotaxis; positive regulation of interleukin-6 production; positive regulation of I-kappaB kinase/NF-kappaB signaling; positive regulation of JNK cascade; cellular response to lipopolysaccharide
Sources:Amigo / QuickGO
Orthologs
Databases	NCBI: entry; OMA: entry
Species	Human	Mouse
Entrez	26525	54450
Ensembl	ENSG00000136695	ENSMUSG00000026983
UniProt	Q9UBH0	Q9QYY1
RefSeq (mRNA)	NM_173170; NM_012275	NM_001146087; NM_001146088; NM_019451
RefSeq (protein)	NP_036407; NP_775262	NP_001139559; NP_001139560; NP_062324
Location (UCSC)	Chr 2: 113.06 – 113.07 Mb	Chr 2: 24.17 – 24.17 Mb
PubMed search
- Wikidata
View/Edit Human	View/Edit Mouse

Interleukin 36 receptor antagonist (IL-36RA) is a member of the interleukin-36 family of cytokines. It was previously named Interleukin-1 family member 5 (IL1F5).

The protein is known to inhibit the effects of Interleukin-36 cytokines (IL-36α, IL-36β and IL-36γ) via competing with their receptor IL-36R/IL1RL2 and thereby inhibiting their proinflammatory effects.

== Roles in disease ==
Mutations in the IL-36RN gene resulting in a decrease or production of defective IL-36RA protein have been shown to cause inflammatory skin diseases including generalised pustular psoriasis, acrodermatitis continua suppurativa Hallopeau (ACH) and acute generalized exanthematous pustulosis (AGEP).
