= Interleukin 1-alpha =

Protein-coding gene in the species Homo sapiens

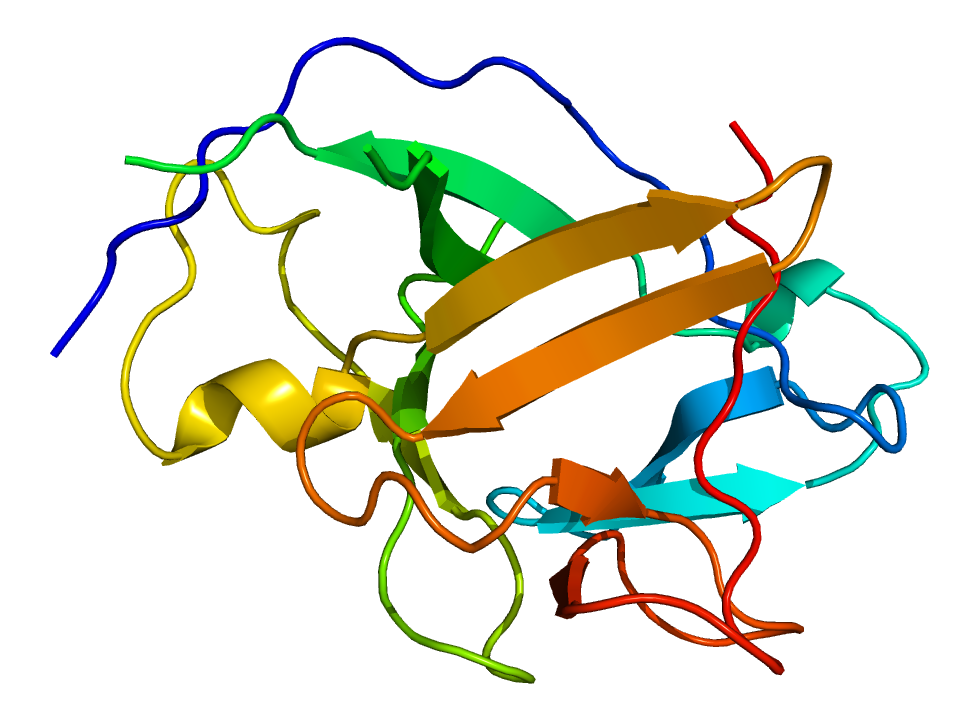

Identifiers
- Aliases: IL1A, IL-1A, IL1, IL1-ALPHA, IL1F1, interleukin 1 alpha, IL-1 alpha, IL-1α
- External IDs: OMIM: 147760; MGI: 96542; GeneCards: IL1A
Available structures
PDB	Ortholog search: PDBe RCSB
PDB	List of PDB id codes 2ILA, 2KKI, 2L5X

Gene location (Human)
Chr.	Chromosome 2 (human)
Band	2q14.1	Start	112,773,925 bp
Band	2q14.1	End	112,784,493 bp

Gene location (Mouse)
Chr.	Chromosome 2 (mouse)
Band	2 F1|2 62.9 cM	Start	129,141,530 bp
Band	2 F1|2 62.9 cM	End	129,151,892 bp
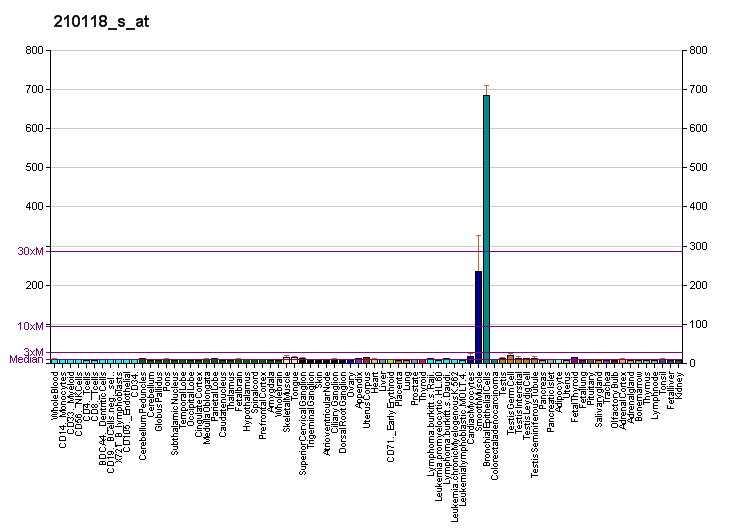
RNA expression pattern
Bgee	Human / Mouse (ortholog); Top expressed in: periodontal fiber; oral cavity; buccal mucosa cell; mucosa of urinary bladder; testicle; gums; right testis; left testis; gingival epithelium; islet of Langerhans / Top expressed in: esophagus; skin of back; embryo; epidermis; cornea; spermatocyte; liver; corneal stroma; lip; placenta; More reference expression data
BioGPS	More reference expression data
Gene ontology
Molecular function	cytokine activity; protein binding; copper ion binding; interleukin-1 receptor binding
Cellular component	cytosol; extracellular region; cytoplasm; extracellular space
Biological process	cellular response to heat; response to copper ion; positive regulation of angiogenesis; positive regulation of gene expression; immune response; connective tissue replacement involved in inflammatory response wound healing; positive regulation of protein secretion; extrinsic apoptotic signaling pathway in absence of ligand; ectopic germ cell programmed cell death; positive regulation of vascular endothelial growth factor production; cell population proliferation; inflammatory response; negative regulation of extrinsic apoptotic signaling pathway in absence of ligand; positive regulation of mitotic nuclear division; positive regulation of cell division; positive regulation of transcription by RNA polymerase II; negative regulation of cell population proliferation; apoptotic process; positive regulation of interleukin-6 production; positive regulation of neutrophil extravasation; fever generation; positive regulation of monocyte chemotactic protein-1 production; regulation of signaling receptor activity; cytokine-mediated signaling pathway; interleukin-1-mediated signaling pathway
Sources:Amigo / QuickGO
Orthologs
Databases	NCBI: entry; OMA: entry
Species	Human	Mouse
Entrez	3552	16175
Ensembl	ENSG00000115008	ENSMUSG00000027399
UniProt	P01583	P01582
RefSeq (mRNA)	NM_000575; NM_001371554	NM_010554
RefSeq (protein)	NP_000566; NP_001358483	NP_034684
Location (UCSC)	Chr 2: 112.77 – 112.78 Mb	Chr 2: 129.14 – 129.15 Mb
PubMed search
- Wikidata
View/Edit Human	View/Edit Mouse

Interleukin-1 alpha (IL-1 alpha or IL-1α) also known as hematopoietin 1 is a cytokine of the interleukin 1 family that is encoded by the IL1A gene in humans. In general, interleukin 1 is responsible for causing inflammation, as well as promoting fever and sepsis. IL-1α inhibitors have been developed to interrupt those processes and treat diseases, although other dual-action inhibitors are currently of larger interest to the medical community.

IL-1α is produced mainly by activated macrophages, as well as neutrophils, epithelial cells, and endothelial cells. It possesses metabolic, physiological, haematopoietic activities, and plays one of the central roles in the regulation of the immune responses. It binds to the interleukin-1 receptor, and participates in the tumor necrosis factor-alpha activation pathway.

== Discovery ==
Interleukin 1 was discovered by Igal Gery, Richard K. Gershon, and Byron H. Waksman, from the Departments of Microbiology and Pathology at Yale School of Medicine, in 1972. They named it lymphocyte-activating factor (LAF) because it was a lymphocyte mitogen. It was not until 1985 that interleukin 1 was discovered to consist of two distinct proteins, now called interleukin-1 alpha and interleukin-1 beta.

== Alternative names ==
IL-1α is also known as fibroblast-activating factor (FAF), lymphocyte-activating factor (LAF), B-cell-activating factor (BAF), leukocyte endogenous mediator (LEM), epidermal cell-derived thymocyte-activating factor (ETAF), serum amyloid A inducer or hepatocyte-stimulating factor (HSP), catabolin, hemopoetin-1 (H-1), endogenous pyrogen (EP), and proteolysis-inducing factor (PIF).

== Synthesis and structure ==
IL-1α is an unusual member in the cytokine family due to its missing signal peptide fragment in the structure of its initially synthesized precursor. The same is observed in IL-1β and IL-18. The "mature" form of IL-1α lacks about 100 N-terminal amino acids, which are removed by proteases. Calpain, a calcium-activated cysteine protease, associated with the plasma membrane, is primarily responsible for the cleavage of the IL-1α precursor into a mature molecule. Both the 31 kDa precursor form of IL-1α and its 18 kDa mature form are biologically active.

The 31 kDa IL-1α precursor is synthesized in association with cytoskeletal structures (microtubules), unlike most secreted proteins, which are translated on ribosomes associated with rough endoplasmic reticulum.

The three-dimensional structure of the IL-1α contains an open-ended barrel composed entirely of beta-pleated sheets. Crystal structure analysis of the mature form of IL-1α shows that it has two binding sites for the IL-1 receptor. There is a primary binding site located at the open top of its barrel, which is similar but not identical to that of IL-1β.

== Production and cellular sources ==
IL-1α is constitutively produced by epithelial cells. It is found in substantial amounts in normal human epidermis and is distributed in a 1:1 ratio between living epidermal cells and stratum corneum. The constitutive production of large amounts of IL-1α precursor by healthy epidermal keratinocytes interfere with the important role of IL-1α in immune responses, assuming skin as a barrier, which prevents the entry of pathogenic microorganisms into the body.

The essential role of IL-1α in maintenance of skin barrier function, especially with increasing age, is an additional explanation of IL-1α constitutive production in epidermis.

With the exception of skin keratinocytes, some epithelial cells and certain cells in central nervous system, the mRNA coding for IL-1α (and, thus, IL-1α itself) is not observed in health in most of cell types, tissues, and blood, in spite of wide physiological, metabolic, haematopoietic, and immunological IL-1α activities.

A wide variety of other cells only upon stimulation can be induced to transcribe the IL-1α genes and produce the precursor form of IL-1α, Among them are fibroblasts, macrophages, granulocytes, eosinophils, mast cells and basophils, endothelial cells, platelets, monocytes and myeloid cell lines, blood T-lymphocytes and B-lymphocytes, astrocytes, kidney mesangial cells, Langerhans cells, dermal dendritic cells, natural killer cells, large granular lymphocytes, microglia, blood neutrophils, lymph node cells, maternal placental cells and several other cell types.

IL-1α is found on the surface of senescent cells, where it contributes to the production of senescence-associated secretory phenotype (SASP) factors.

These data suggest that IL-1α is normally an epidermal cytokine.

== Interactions ==
IL-1α has been shown to interact with HAX1, and NDN.

Although there are many interactions of IL-1α with other cytokines, the most consistent and most clinically relevant is its synergism with TNF. IL-1α and TNF are both acute-phase cytokines that act to promote fever and inflammation. There are, in fact, few examples in which the synergism between IL-1α and TNF-α has not been demonstrated. These include radioprotection, the Shwartzman reaction, PGE_{2} synthesis, sickness behavior, nitric oxide production, nerve growth factor synthesis, insulin resistance, loss of lean body mass, and IL-8 and chemokine synthesis.

Translation of mRNA for IL-1α is highly dependent upon mTOR activity. IL-1α and NF-κB mutually induce each other in a positive feedback loop.

== Regulatory molecules ==
The most important regulatory molecule for IL-1α activity is IL-1Ra, which is usually produced in a 10- to 100-fold molar excess. In addition, the soluble form of the IL-1R type I has a high affinity for IL-1α and is produced in a 5-10 molar excess. IL-10 also inhibits IL-1α synthesis.

== Biological activity ==
=== in vitro ===
IL-1α possesses biological effect on cells in the picomolar to femtomolar range. In particular, IL-1α:

- stimulates keratinocytes and macrophages for induced IL-1α secretion
- induces pro-collagen type I and III synthesis
- causes proliferation of fibroblasts, induces collagenase secretion, induces cytoskeletal rearrangements, induces IL-6 and GCSF secretion
- induces cyclooxygenase synthesis and prostaglandin PGE_{2} release
- causes phosphorylation of heat shock protein
- causes proliferation of smooth muscle cells, keratinocytes and stimulates release of other cytokines by keratinocytes
- induces TNF-α release by endothelial cells and Ca^{2+} release from osteoclasts.
- stimulates hepatocytes for secretion of acute-phase proteins
- induces proliferation of CD4^{+} cells, IL-2 production, co-stimulates CD8^{+}/IL-1R+ cells, induces proliferation of mature B-cells and immunoglobulin secretion
- kills a limited number of tumor cells types

=== in vivo ===
Shortly after an onset of an infection into organism, IL-1α activates a set of immune system response processes. In particular, IL-1α:

- stimulates fibroblasts proliferation
- induces synthesis of proteases, subsequent muscle proteolysis, release of all types of amino acids in blood and stimulates acute-phase proteins synthesis
- changes the metallic ion content of blood plasma by increasing copper and decreasing zinc and iron concentration in blood
- induces production of SASP factors by senescent cells as a result of mTOR activity
- increases blood neutrophils
- activates lymphocyte proliferation and induces fever

Topically administered IL-1α also stimulates expression of FGF and EGF, and subsequent fibroblasts and keratinocytes proliferation. This, plus the presence of large depot of IL-1α precursor in keratinocytes, suggests that locally released IL-1α may play an important role and accelerate wound healing.

IL-1α is known to protect against lethal doses of γ-irradiation in mice, possibly as a result of hemopoietin-1 activity.

== Applications ==
=== Pharmaceutical ===
Clinical trials on IL-1α have been carried out that are specifically designed to mimic the protective studies in animals. IL-1α has been administered to patients during receiving autologous bone marrow transplantation. The treatment with 50 ng/kg IL-1α from day zero of autologous bone marrow or stem cells transfer resulted in an earlier recovery of thrombocytopenia compared with historical controls. IL-1α is currently being evaluated in clinical trials as a potential therapeutic in oncology indications.

An anti-IL-1α therapeutic antibody, bermekimab (MABp1), was tested in clinical trials for anti-neoplastic activity in solid tumors. Blocking the activity of IL-1α has the potential to treat skin diseases such as acne.
