= Coxsackie B4 virus =

Virus classification
- (unranked): Virus
- Realm: Riboviria
- Kingdom: Orthornavirae
- Phylum: Pisuviricota
- Class: Pisoniviricetes
- Order: Picornavirales
- Family: Picornaviridae
- Genus: Enterovirus
- Species: Enterovirus B
- Virus: Coxsackie B4 virus

Virus subtype

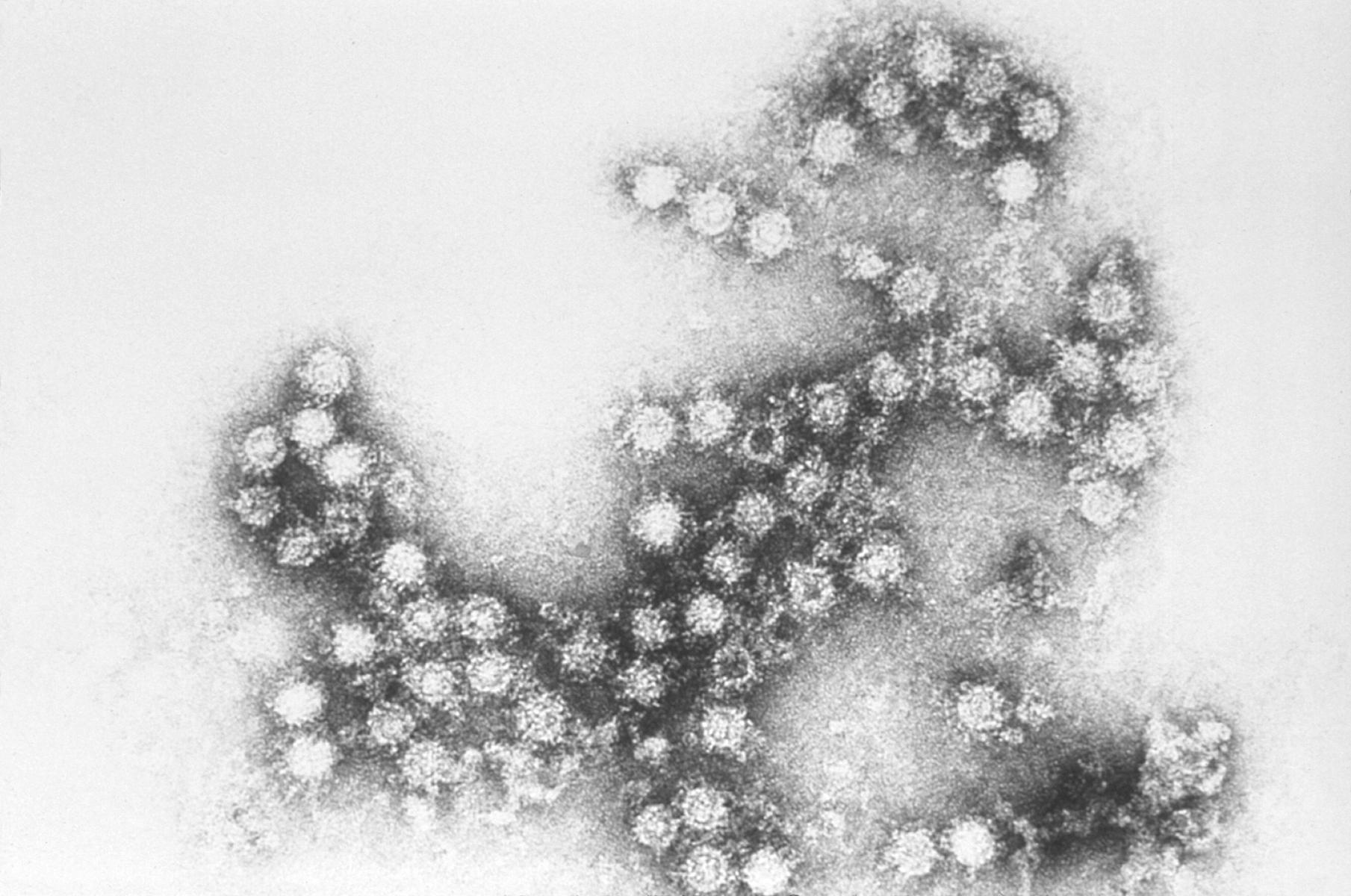
Coxsackie B4 virus seen with an immunoelectron microscope.

Coxsackie B4 virus are enteroviruses that belong to the Picornaviridae family. These viruses can be found worldwide. They are positive-sense, single-stranded, non-enveloped RNA viruses with icosahedral geometry. Coxsackieviruses have two groups, A and B, each associated with different diseases. Coxsackievirus group A is known for causing hand-foot-and-mouth diseases while Group B, which contains six serotypes, can cause a varying range of symptoms like gastrointestinal distress myocarditis. Coxsackievirus B4 has a cell tropism for natural killer cells and pancreatic islet cells. Infection can lead to beta cell apoptosis which increases the risk of insulitis.

== Viral structure and genome ==
Coxsackievirus B4 is one of the six serotypes found in Group B and is a positive sense, single-stranded, non-enveloped RNA virus. Its genome is linear and is 7,293 nucleotides in length with both a 5’ and 3’ untranslated region and encodes its own 3’ poly-A tail. The 5’ untranslated region contains an internal ribosomal entry site (Type I IRES). Covalently bonded to the 5’ UTR is the viral protein VPg which aids in viral entry and replication. 2A and 3C are viral proteinases which aid in the cleavage of the polyprotein encoded for by the genome. 3D is the RNA-dependent RNA polymerase (RdRP). 2B, 2C, and 3A are core viral proteins. The genome also codes for 4 capsid proteins, VP4, VP1, VP2, and VP3 that form an icosahedral capsid for the viral particles that is about 30 nm. VP1-VP3 are responsible for the outer surface of the virion, while VP4 is imbedded within the capsid. Altogether, the polyprotein encoded for by the coxsackievirus genome is almost 2,200 amino acids in length, and is eventually cleaved by the 2A and 3C proteinases as well as by host cell proteinases.

As Coxsackievirus B4, and all other members of the picornavirus family, are non-enveloped, they are notably resilient to disinfectants, solvents, low pH levels (i.e. stomach acid), low temperatures, and 70% alcohol.

== Viral replication ==
=== Attachment, entry and uncoating ===
The capsid of Coxsackie viruses have a distinguishable depression around the fivefold axis, termed the “canyon.” The canyon is thought to help with viral attachment through the interaction with cell surface molecules. (Riabi, 2014) When VP1 binds to the Coxsackie-Adenovirus receptor (CAR), which can be found on heart muscle cells as well as epithelial and endothelial cells, a conformational change causes the host cell receptors to form a pore in the plasma membrane through which the VPg-linked viral genome could enter the cell. Uncoating is unnecessary as it leaves the capsid at the plasma membrane and the genome is simply injected into the cytoplasm.

=== Replication ===
For positive sense, single-stranded RNA viruses, translation occurs before transcription. Upon entry of the genome into the cytoplasm of the host cell, the IRES in the 5’ UTR recruits ribosomal subunits (cap-independent mechanism) which starts the translation process. Once the polypeptide is completely translated, viral proteinases 2A and 3C, as well as cellular proteinases, cleave the polyprotein into individual proteins that will help continue the viral replication process.

As soon as viral proteins have been translated and cleaved, negative sense transcripts of the viral genome are made to serve as a template for more positive-sense viral genome transcripts (which also serves as mRNA which can also be translated into more viral proteins). The viral genome encodes for a poly-A tail, which can be recognized by cellular initiation factors and ribosomal subunits which kick starts the transcription process to make the negative-sense strand, forming a double-stranded RNA intermediate

Upon transcription of the negative sense RNA, it needs to get primed in order to start making more positive sense RNA genome. The VPg protein that is covalently linked to the 5’ end of the RNA genome has 2 U’s attached to it. The purpose of these U’s is to modify the VPg protein which serves as a protein primer which the viral RdRP can recognize and start forming more genome from the negative-sense.

The viral protein 2C brings positive sense RNA genomes to the endoplasmic reticulum where assembly and maturation will occur.

While all of this is occurring, viral proteinases are working to turn off host cell protein synthesis by cleaving the eIF-4 initiation factor. This process accomplishes the inhibition of ribosomes binding to host cell mRNAs. This effectively shuts down cap-dependent translation in the host cell.

=== Assembly, maturation and egress ===
Once viral genome and viral proteins reach high enough concentrations within the host cell, structural proteins must assemble. The final step in maturation of the virus is when VP0, a precursor protein, is cleaved into VP2 and VP4. Viral capsid proteins come together to form pentamers, 12 of which come together to form an empty capsid, or procapsid (Expasy, Hunt, 2010). As mentioned before, the viral protein 2C brings CB4 viral genome to the endoplasmic reticulum where vesicle formation begins. The ER membrane moves to surround the genome and proteins, at which point the procapsid attaches to the exterior of the vesicle and encapsidates the genome and proteins. It is at this point that VP0 gets cleaved by a cellular proteinase and the virus finally becomes fully mature and infectious. Since CB4 is a non-enveloped virus, it accomplishes egress through cytolysis, breaking through the plasma membrane in order to move on to infect other cells in the host (Hunt, 2010)

== Symptoms ==
Coxsackie B 1–4 viruses are typically the most severe and fatal neonatal diseases. Common symptoms can include myocarditis, meningoencephalitis, and hepatitis. Other less severe symptoms can include pneumonia, Gastrointestinal symptoms, pancreatitis, and seizures. Patients with Coxsackie B4 virus have seemed to have herpangina, tonsillitis, and pharyngitis.

CB4 virus has caused transplacental infections in mice. Infection in the first couple weeks of gestation has been shown to be harmful for dams as well as the fetus, causing reduced litter sizes, abortion, or stillbirth. Pups that were born from dams infected on days 4 and 17 of gestation had significantly (p < 0.05) greater pancreatic abnormalities leading to symptoms similar to diabetes.

== Coxsackie B4 virus and type 1 diabetes ==
One theory proposes that type 1 diabetes is a virus-triggered autoimmune response in which the immune system attacks virus-infected cells along with the beta cells in the pancreas, but to date there is no stringent evidence to support this hypothesis in humans.

A 2004 systematic review analyzing a possible association between coxsackievirus B infection and type 1 diabetes was inconclusive. A 2011 systematic review and meta-analysis showed an association between enterovirus infections and type 1 diabetes, but in contrast, other studies have shown that rather than triggering an autoimmune process, enterovirus infections, as coxsackievirus B, could protect against onset and development of type 1 diabetes.

== Transmission to neonates ==
Enteroviruses commonly infect neonates and infants younger than 12 months. Coxsackie b viruses are usually spread to infants through perinatal transmission. However, more severe cases of coxsackie B viruses are spread through transplacental transmission. Common symptoms of neonatal coxsackie B virus infection in children include meningitis and/or encephalitis. Coxsackie B4 virus is able to infect the brain and spinal cord and cause inflammation.

== Diagnosis ==
Infection due to Coxsackie B viruses can be determined by measuring the amount of neutralizing antibodies in the blood, PCR, and through microscopic detection. It is difficult to diagnose CBV based on the symptoms.

== See also ==
- Coxsackie B virus
