= Interleukin-1 receptor =

Cytokine receptor which binds interleukin 1

interleukin 1 receptor, type I

Identifiers
- Symbol: IL1R1
- Alt. symbols: IL1R, IL1RA
- NCBI gene: 3554
- HGNC: 5993
- OMIM: 147810
- RefSeq: NM_000877
- UniProt: P14778

Other data
- Locus: Chr. 2 q12
Search for
- Structures: Swiss-model
- Domains: InterPro

interleukin 1 receptor, type II

Identifiers
- Symbol: IL1R2
- Alt. symbols: IL1RB
- NCBI gene: 7850
- HGNC: 5994
- OMIM: 147811
- RefSeq: NM_173343
- UniProt: P27930

Other data
- Locus: Chr. 2 q12
Search for
- Structures: Swiss-model
- Domains: InterPro

interleukin 1 receptor accessory protein

Identifiers
- Symbol: IL1RAP
- Alt. symbols: IL-1RAcP, IL1R3, C3orf13
- NCBI gene: 3556
- HGNC: 5995
- OMIM: 602626
- RefSeq: NM_134470
- UniProt: Q9NPH3

Other data
- Locus: Chr. 3 q28
Search for
- Structures: Swiss-model
- Domains: InterPro

Interleukin-1 receptor (IL-1R) is a cytokine receptor which binds interleukin 1. Two forms of the receptor exist. The type I receptor is primarily responsible for transmitting the inflammatory effects of interleukin-1 (IL-1) while type II receptors may act as a suppressor of IL-1 activity by competing for IL-1 binding. Also opposing the effects of IL-1 is the IL-1 receptor antagonist (IL-1RA).

The IL-1 receptor accessory protein (IL1RAP) is a transmembrane protein that interacts with IL-1R and is required for IL-1 signal transduction.
