= IL36G =

Protein-coding gene in the species Homo sapiens

Identifiers
- Aliases: IL36G, interleukin 36, gamma, IL-1F9, IL-1H1, IL-1RP2, IL1E, IL1H1, IL1RP2, IL1F9, interleukin 36 gamma
- External IDs: OMIM: 605542; MGI: 2449929; GeneCards: IL36G
Available structures
PDB	Ortholog search: PDBe RCSB
PDB	List of PDB id codes 4IZE, 4P0J, 4P0K, 4P0L

Gene location (Human)
Chr.	Chromosome 2 (human)
Band	2q14.1	Start	112,973,203 bp
Band	2q14.1	End	112,985,658 bp

Gene location (Mouse)
Chr.	Chromosome 2 (mouse)
Band	2 A3|2 16.24 cM	Start	24,076,488 bp
Band	2 A3|2 16.24 cM	End	24,083,580 bp
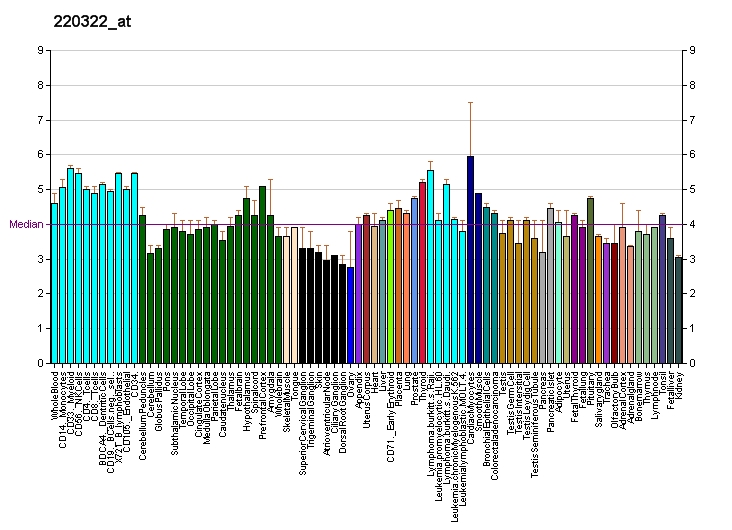
RNA expression pattern
Bgee	Human / Mouse (ortholog); Top expressed in: periodontal fiber; testicle; gums; gingival epithelium; skin of leg; cartilage tissue; gonad; skin of abdomen; human penis; body of tongue / Top expressed in: granulocyte; esophagus; gastrula; umbilical cord; lip; skin of external ear; tibiofemoral joint; blood; cervix; skin of back; More reference expression data
BioGPS	More reference expression data
Gene ontology
Molecular function	cytokine activity; interleukin-1 receptor binding
Cellular component	extracellular region; extracellular space
Biological process	cell-cell signaling; innate immune response; inflammatory response; immune system process; immune response; regulation of signaling receptor activity; cytokine-mediated signaling pathway; neutrophil chemotaxis; positive regulation of interleukin-6 production; positive regulation of I-kappaB kinase/NF-kappaB signaling; negative regulation of myoblast differentiation; positive regulation of JNK cascade; cellular response to lipopolysaccharide; negative regulation of myoblast fusion
Sources:Amigo / QuickGO
Orthologs
Databases	NCBI: entry; OMA: entry
Species	Human	Mouse
Entrez	56300	215257
Ensembl	ENSG00000136688	ENSMUSG00000044103
UniProt	Q9NZH8	Q8R460; Q3U0P4
RefSeq (mRNA)	NM_001278568; NM_019618	NM_153511
RefSeq (protein)	NP_001265497; NP_062564	NP_705731
Location (UCSC)	Chr 2: 112.97 – 112.99 Mb	Chr 2: 24.08 – 24.08 Mb
PubMed search
- Wikidata
View/Edit Human	View/Edit Mouse

Interleukin-36 gamma previously known as interleukin-1 family member 9 (IL1F9) is a protein that in humans is encoded by the IL36G gene.

== Expression ==
IL36G is well-expressed in the epithelium of the skin, gut, and lung. In the skin IL36G is predominantly expressed in epidermal granular layer keratinocytes with little to no expression in basal layer keratinocytes.

== Function ==
The protein encoded by this gene is a member of the interleukin-1 cytokine family. This gene and eight other interleukin-1 family genes form a cytokine gene cluster on chromosome 2. The activity of this cytokine is mediated via the interleukin-1 receptor-like 2 (IL1RL2/IL1R-rp2/IL-36 receptor), and is specifically inhibited by interleukin-36 receptor antagonist, (IL-36RA/IL1F5/IL-1 delta). Interferon-gamma, tumor necrosis factor-alpha and interleukin-1 β (IL-1β) are reported to stimulate the expression of this cytokine in keratinocytes. The expression of this cytokine in keratinocytes can also be induced by a multiple Pathogen-Associated Molecular Patterns (PAMPs). Both IL-36γ mRNA and protein have been linked to psoriasis lesions and has been used as a biomarker for differentiating between eczema and psoriasis. As with many other interleukin-1 family cytokines IL-36γ requires proteolytic cleavage of its N-terminus for full biological activity. However, unlike IL-1β the activation of IL-36γ is inflammasome-independent. IL-36γ is specifically cleaved by the endogenous protease cathepsin S as well exogenous proteases derived from fungal and bacterial pathogens.
