= Skin immunity =

Skin immunity is a property of skin that allows it to resist infections from pathogens. In addition to providing a passive physical barrier against infection, the skin also contains elements of the innate and adaptive immune systems which allows it to actively fight infections. Hence the skin provides defense in depth against infection.

The skin acts as a barrier, a kind of sheath, made of several layers of cells and their related glands. The skin is a dynamic organ that contains different cells which contains elements of the innate and the adaptive immune systems which are activated when the tissue is under attack by invading pathogens. Shortly after infection, the immune adaptive response is induced by dendritic cells (Langerhans cells) present in the epidermis; they are responsible for the capture, processing, and presentation of antigens to T lymphocytes in local lymphoid organs. As a result, T lymphocytes express the cutaneous lymphocyte antigen (CLA) molecule, a modified form of P-selectin glycoprotein ligand-1. Lymphocytes move to the epidermis where they reside as memory T cells, they will thus be activated and will trigger an inflammatory response. Dysregulation of these mechanisms is associated with inflammatory diseases of the skin.

== Afferent and efferent phases of the immune system of the skin ==
Some humoral and cellular components of the skin pass through the vessel lymph to get to the circulation. This circulation net has a big importance, it's the way of direct communication between the specific site of the skin and the lymph cells found inside the lymph node and the systematic tissues. The epidermis antigens are connected with some cells of the skin. Among them there are the APC, antigen presenting cells (Langerhans, dendritic and cutaneous). They capture the antigen, they process it and they present it on their surface as being associated with the MHC-II. Keratinocytes produce TNFα and IL-1 which act on the Langerhans cells, inducing an increase of the expression of histocompatibility complex and cytokine secretion. Moreover, they induce their migration from the skin to the paracortical areas of the lymph nodes. Once there, these cells can provide the necessary stimulus for the lymphocytes T, who will proliferate and express the cutaneous receptor recruitment and to various chemo attractants that promote the accumulation of dermal micro vascular endothelial cells of inflamed skin to finally enter the skin tissue. Once the activated lymphocytes arrive, they get in contact with the antigen, they proliferate and develop their effector functions in order to neutralize or eliminate the pathogen. The Langerhans cells promote and permit the start of the cellular immune response of lymphocytes through the skin and are recruited from the peripheral blood. Antigen presentation may occur in peripheral lymphoid tissues.

== Antigenic presentation from the Langerhans cells to the lymphocytes ==
The Langerhans cells, once they are activated, rapidly migrate to the lymph nodes where they will accumulate in the paracortex and show the antigen of the skin to the lymph nodes via efferent lymph vessels. The Langerhans cells induce a vast proliferation of the naïve lymphocytes T and they participate in the immunoestimulation phase of the immune response, converting the lymphocytes in T helper cells. Recently, it has been shown that Langerhans cells can express an antigenic peptide associated to MHC-I capable of inducing a response from the cytotoxic LT and effector functions, such as the production of cytokines.

== Microbiota and skin immunity ==
Skin microbiota plays an important role in tissue homeostasis and local immunity. Skin microbial communities are highly diverse and can be remodeled over time or in response to environment challenges.

From around 2005 on, the scientific community has thoroughly developed the concept of human microbiome and begun the systematic study to establish the relationship between the microbiome and human physiology in health and disease. We begin to understand that gut microbiota helps modulating host immunity at a systemic level. However, gut microbiome does not affect skin immunity significantly, instead, skin immunity is modulated by skin microflora according to the results obtained by Naik et al. Analyzing immunologic changes of germ-free (GF) mice with reconstituted gut microbiota showed a recovery of Il-17A and IFN-γ levels up to those observed in the gastrointestinal tract of specific pathogen free (SPF) mice but gut microbiome restoration did not affect skin immunity. Comparing GF and SPF mice showed a decrease in the skin production of IFN-γ and IL-17A. To evaluate the functional consequences of the absence of skin microbiota Leishmania major was introduced intradermally and the lesions were evaluated. L. major lesions in GF mice were significantly smaller and less severe than in SPF mice, however, the number of parasites after infection was significantly higher in GF mice. These results clearly indicate that GF mice have an impaired capacity of response in front of infections compared to SPF mice. Finally, mono-association of GF mice with S. epidermidis clearly restored immunity function which in the case of skin is mediated by IL-1 which is key for the restoration of IL-17A and IFN-γ levels. Thus skin commensals exert their effect by enhancing IL-1 signaling and amplifying responses according to local inflammatory milieu. As IL-1 has been implicated in the etiology and pathology of psoriasis and other cutaneous disorders, it is likely that skin commensals are important drivers and amplifiers of skin pathologies.

=== T cells and microbiota in skin immunity ===
Recent studies have demonstrated that specific components of the microbiota, as well as their metabolites, selectively promote the activation and the expansion of different T cell subsets under normal and/or pathological conditions. For example, colonization with Staphylococcus epidermidis may have diverse effects, as promote the growth of IL-17A+ CD8+ T cells that reside in the epidermis. This, would limit pathogen invasion improving innate immune barrier in an IL-17 dependent manner. According to an investigation led by US researchers, skin-resident CD11b+ dendritic cells would be the ones to orchestrate a specific response after interacting with commensal bacteria stimulating the proliferation of IL-17A+ CD8+ T cells through their capacity to produce IL-1. This activation mechanism is commensal specific and clearly belongs to the adaptive immune system; however, it strikingly improves innate immune protection as shown after challenging gnobiotic mice with Candida albicans. Indeed, mono-association of gnobiotic mice with S. epidermidis significantly improves innate protection against C. albicans. The connection between the innate and the adaptive system is driven in this case by the production of alarmins S100A8 and S100A9 known to elicit microbicidal responses and as potent chemoattractants for neutrophils.

The majority bacteria tested increased the number of skin T cells. Interactions between T cells and specific microbiota components may represent evolutionary outcome by which the skin immune system and the microbiota provide heterologous protection against invasive pathogens and calibrate barrier immunity through the use of chemical signals. This shows that the skin immune system is a highly dynamic environment that can be rapidly and specifically remodeled by certain commensals.

Finally, studying microbiota interactions and skin T cells can help to detect the cause of various diseases and possible cures for these. The increasing development of tools for personalized medicine will undoubtedly help to this goal, because each person has a different microbiota.
