= IL36B =

Protein-coding gene in the species Homo sapiens

Identifiers
- Aliases: IL36B, FIL1, FIL1-(ETA), FIL1H, FILI-(ETA), IL-1F8, IL-1H2, IL1-ETA, IL1F8, IL1H2, interleukin 36, beta, interleukin 36 beta
- External IDs: OMIM: 605508; MGI: 1916927; GeneCards: IL36B

Gene location (Human)
Chr.	Chromosome 2 (human)
Band	2q14.1	Start	113,022,089 bp
Band	2q14.1	End	113,052,867 bp

Gene location (Mouse)
Chr.	Chromosome 2 (mouse)
Band	2 A3|2 16.21 cM	Start	24,043,173 bp
Band	2 A3|2 16.21 cM	End	24,050,531 bp
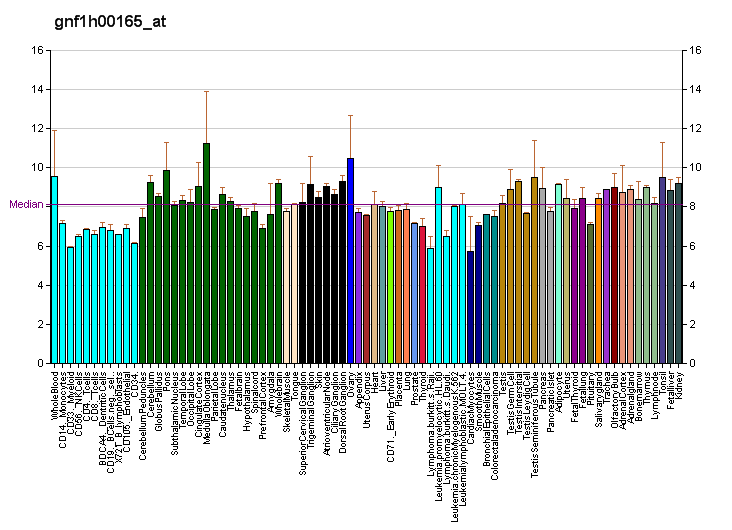

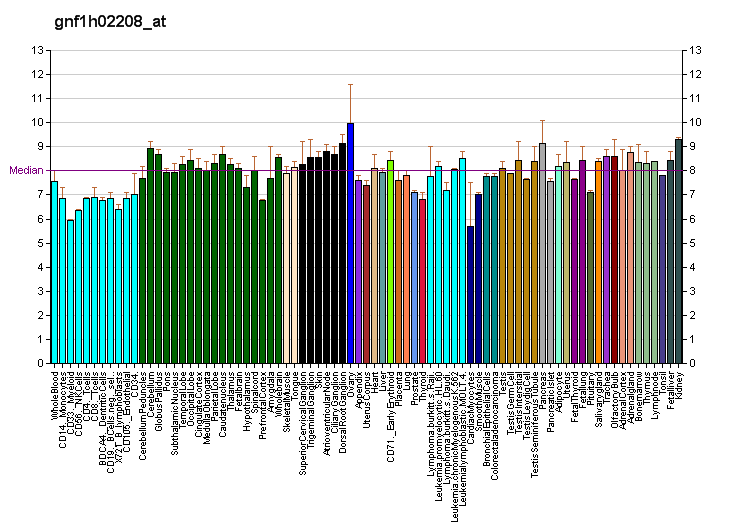

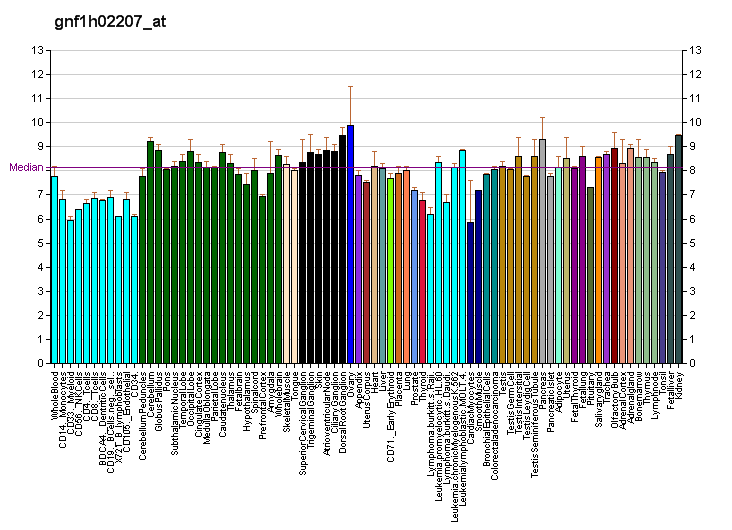
RNA expression pattern
Bgee	Human / Mouse (ortholog); Top expressed in: skin of leg; skin of abdomen; islet of Langerhans; tonsil; stromal cell of endometrium; vagina; head; mouth; exocrine gland; oral mucosa / Top expressed in: esophagus; lip; skin of external ear; cervix; umbilical cord; lumbar subsegment of spinal cord; trachea; granulocyte; skin of abdomen; digastric muscle; More reference expression data
BioGPS	More reference expression data
Gene ontology
Molecular function	cytokine activity; interleukin-1 receptor binding
Cellular component	extracellular region; extracellular space
Biological process	innate immune response; inflammatory response; immune response; immune system process; regulation of signaling receptor activity; cytokine-mediated signaling pathway; neutrophil chemotaxis; positive regulation of interleukin-6 production; positive regulation of I-kappaB kinase/NF-kappaB signaling; positive regulation of T cell differentiation; positive regulation of JNK cascade; cellular response to lipopolysaccharide
Sources:Amigo / QuickGO
Orthologs
Databases	NCBI: entry; OMA: entry
Species	Human	Mouse
Entrez	27177	69677
Ensembl	ENSG00000136696	ENSMUSG00000026985
UniProt	Q9NZH7	Q9D6Z6
RefSeq (mRNA)	NM_014438; NM_173178	NM_027163
RefSeq (protein)	NP_055253; NP_775270	NP_081439
Location (UCSC)	Chr 2: 113.02 – 113.05 Mb	Chr 2: 24.04 – 24.05 Mb
PubMed search
- Wikidata
View/Edit Human	View/Edit Mouse

Interleukin-36 beta also known as interleukin-1 family member 8 (IL1F8) is a protein that in humans is encoded by the IL36B gene.

== Function ==
The protein encoded by this gene is a member of the interleukin 1 cytokine family. Protein structure modeling indicated that this cytokine may contain a 12-stranded beta-trefoil structure that is conserved between IL1A (IL-A alpha) and IL1B (IL-1 beta). This gene and eight other interleukin 1 family genes form a cytokine gene cluster on chromosome 2. Two alternatively spliced transcript variants encoding distinct isoforms have been reported.
