= IL1F10 =

Human protein and coding gene

Identifiers
- Aliases: IL1F10, FIL1-theta, IL-1HY2, IL-38, IL1-theta, IL1HY2, FKSG75, interleukin 1 family member 10 (theta), interleukin 1 family member 10
- External IDs: OMIM: 615296; MGI: 2652548; GeneCards: IL1F10
Available structures
PDB	Ortholog search: PDBe RCSB
PDB	List of PDB id codes 5BOW

Gene location (Human)
Chr.	Chromosome 2 (human)
Band	2q14.1	Start	113,067,970 bp
Band	2q14.1	End	113,075,843 bp

Gene location (Mouse)
Chr.	Chromosome 2 (mouse)
Band	2 A3|2 16.32 cM	Start	24,181,208 bp
Band	2 A3|2 16.32 cM	End	24,183,832 bp
RNA expression pattern
Bgee	Human / Mouse (ortholog); Top expressed in: skin of limb; skin of leg; skin of abdomen; skin of thigh; human penis; amniotic fluid; gonad; pharynx; tonsil; placenta / Top expressed in: lip; skin of abdomen; skin of external ear; skin of back; hair follicle; cervix; thymus; More reference expression data
BioGPS	n/a
Gene ontology
Molecular function	cytokine activity; interleukin-1 receptor binding
Cellular component	extracellular space; extracellular region
Biological process	inflammatory response; immune response; regulation of signaling receptor activity; cytokine-mediated signaling pathway; cellular response to cytokine stimulus; neutrophil chemotaxis; positive regulation of interleukin-6 production; positive regulation of I-kappaB kinase/NF-kappaB signaling; positive regulation of JNK cascade; cellular response to lipopolysaccharide
Sources:Amigo / QuickGO
Orthologs
Databases	NCBI: entry; OMA: entry
Species	Human	Mouse
Entrez	84639	215274
Ensembl	ENSG00000136697	ENSMUSG00000046845
UniProt	Q8WWZ1	Q8R459
RefSeq (mRNA)	NM_173161; NM_032556	NM_153077
RefSeq (protein)	NP_115945; NP_775184	NP_694717
Location (UCSC)	Chr 2: 113.07 – 113.08 Mb	Chr 2: 24.18 – 24.18 Mb
PubMed search
- Wikidata
View/Edit Human	View/Edit Mouse

Interleukin-1 family member 10 is a protein that in humans is encoded by the IL1F10 gene.

The protein encoded by this gene is a member of the interleukin 1 cytokine family. This gene and eight other interleukin 1 family genes form a cytokine gene cluster on chromosome 2. This cytokine is thought to participate in a network of interleukin 1 family members to regulate adapted and innate immune responses. Two alternatively spliced transcript variants encoding the same protein have been reported.
