= IL36A =

Protein-coding gene in the species Homo sapiens

Identifiers
- Aliases: IL36A, FIL1, FIL1(EPSILON), FIL1E, IL-1F6, IL1(EPSILON), IL1F6, interleukin 36, alpha, interleukin 36 alpha
- External IDs: OMIM: 605509; MGI: 1859324; GeneCards: IL36A

Gene location (Human)
Chr.	Chromosome 2 (human)
Band	2q14.1	Start	113,005,459 bp
Band	2q14.1	End	113,008,044 bp

Gene location (Mouse)
Chr.	Chromosome 2 (mouse)
Band	2 A3|2 16.26 cM	Start	24,105,430 bp
Band	2 A3|2 16.26 cM	End	24,115,714 bp
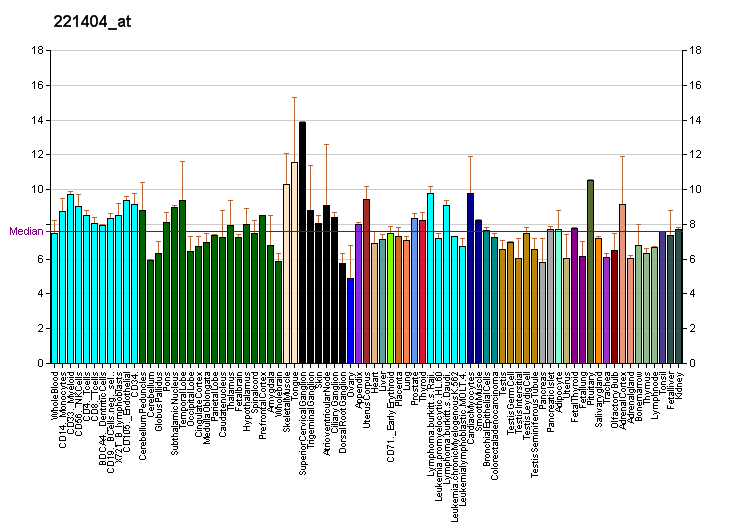
RNA expression pattern
Bgee	Human / Mouse (ortholog); Top expressed in: epithelium of esophagus; testicle; oral cavity; mucosa of pharynx; body of tongue; pancreatic ductal cell; buccal mucosa cell; gums; tonsil; vagina / Top expressed in: esophagus; lip; cervix; right ventricle; skin of external ear; umbilical cord; tibiofemoral joint; lumbar subsegment of spinal cord; temporal muscle; digastric muscle; More reference expression data
BioGPS	More reference expression data
Gene ontology
Molecular function	interleukin-1 receptor binding; cytokine activity
Cellular component	extracellular region; extracellular space
Biological process	positive regulation of interleukin-6 production; innate immune response; positive regulation of cytokine production; immune system process; inflammatory response; immune response; regulation of signaling receptor activity; cytokine-mediated signaling pathway; neutrophil chemotaxis; positive regulation of I-kappaB kinase/NF-kappaB signaling; positive regulation of JNK cascade; cellular response to lipopolysaccharide
Sources:Amigo / QuickGO
Orthologs
Databases	NCBI: entry; OMA: entry
Species	Human	Mouse
Entrez	27179	54448
Ensembl	ENSG00000136694	ENSMUSG00000026984
UniProt	Q9UHA7	Q9JLA2
RefSeq (mRNA)	NM_014440	NM_019450
RefSeq (protein)	NP_055255	NP_062323
Location (UCSC)	Chr 2: 113.01 – 113.01 Mb	Chr 2: 24.11 – 24.12 Mb
PubMed search
- Wikidata
View/Edit Human	View/Edit Mouse

Interleukin-36 alpha also known as interleukin-1 family member 6 (IL1F6) is a protein that in humans is encoded by the IL36A gene.
