= IL1RAP =

Protein-coding gene in the species Homo sapiens

Identifiers
- Aliases: IL1RAP, C3orf13, IL-1RAcP, IL1R3, interleukin 1 receptor accessory protein
- External IDs: OMIM: 602626; MGI: 104975; GeneCards: IL1RAP
Available structures
PDB	Ortholog search: PDBe RCSB
PDB	List of PDB id codes 3O4O, 4DEP
Enzyme activity
EC #	BRENDA	ExPASy	KEGG	MetaCyc
3.2.2.6	↗	↗	↗	↗

Gene location (Human)
Chr.	Chromosome 3 (human)
Band	3q28	Start	190,514,051 bp
Band	3q28	End	190,659,750 bp

Gene location (Mouse)
Chr.	Chromosome 16 (mouse)
Band	16|16 B2	Start	26,400,454 bp
Band	16|16 B2	End	26,548,867 bp
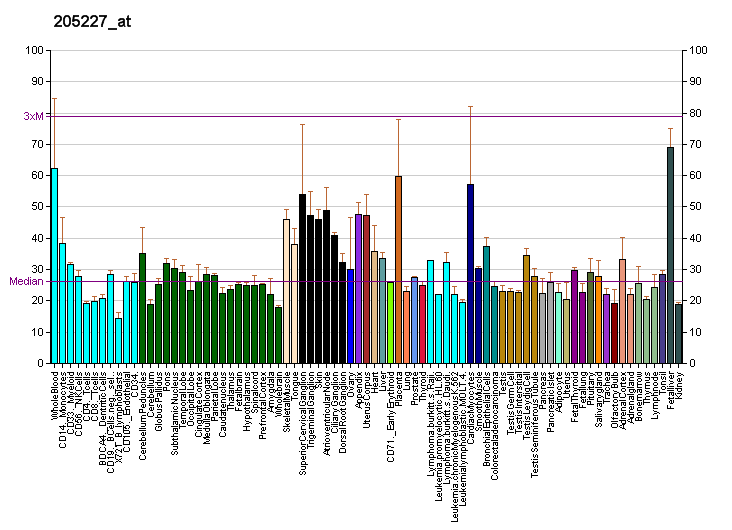
RNA expression pattern
Bgee	Human / Mouse (ortholog); Top expressed in: right lobe of liver; placenta; blood; Achilles tendon; hair follicle; gingival epithelium; olfactory zone of nasal mucosa; gallbladder; germinal epithelium; monocyte / Top expressed in: left lobe of liver; lumbar subsegment of spinal cord; medial geniculate nucleus; dentate gyrus of hippocampal formation granule cell; granulocyte; medial dorsal nucleus; primary oocyte; habenula; lateral geniculate nucleus; spermatid; More reference expression data
BioGPS	More reference expression data
Gene ontology
Molecular function	interleukin-1 receptor activity; protein tyrosine kinase binding; interleukin-33 receptor activity; signal transducer activity; interleukin-1 receptor binding
Cellular component	integral component of membrane; extracellular region; integral component of plasma membrane; membrane; plasma membrane; extracellular space; glutamatergic synapse
Biological process	innate immune response; inflammatory response; immune response; signal transduction; cytokine-mediated signaling pathway; immune system process; positive regulation of NF-kappaB transcription factor activity; positive regulation of dendrite development; interleukin-33-mediated signaling pathway; positive regulation of interleukin-13 production; positive regulation of interleukin-5 production; positive regulation of synapse assembly; protein-containing complex assembly; interleukin-1-mediated signaling pathway; regulation of postsynaptic density assembly; trans-synaptic signaling by trans-synaptic complex; synaptic membrane adhesion; regulation of presynapse assembly
Sources:Amigo / QuickGO
Orthologs
Databases	NCBI: entry; OMA: entry
Species	Human	Mouse
Entrez	3556	16180
Ensembl	ENSG00000196083	ENSMUSG00000022514
UniProt	Q9NPH3	Q61730
RefSeq (mRNA)	NM_001167928; NM_001167929; NM_001167930; NM_001167931; NM_002182 NM_134470; NM_001364879; NM_001364880; NM_001364881	NM_001159317; NM_001159318; NM_008364; NM_134103
RefSeq (protein)	NP_001161400; NP_001161401; NP_001161402; NP_001161403; NP_002173 NP_608273; NP_001351808; NP_001351809; NP_001351810	NP_001152789; NP_001152790; NP_032390; NP_598864
Location (UCSC)	Chr 3: 190.51 – 190.66 Mb	Chr 16: 26.4 – 26.55 Mb
PubMed search
- Wikidata
View/Edit Human	View/Edit Mouse

Interleukin-1 receptor accessory protein is a protein that in humans is encoded by the IL1RAP gene.

Interleukin 1 induces synthesis of acute phase and proinflammatory proteins during infection, tissue damage, or stress, by forming a complex at the cell membrane with an interleukin 1 receptor and an accessory protein. This gene encodes an interleukin 1 receptor accessory protein. Alternative splicing of this gene results in two transcript variants encoding two different isoforms, one membrane-bound and one soluble.

== Interactions ==
IL1RAP has been shown to interact with TOLLIP and Interleukin 1 receptor, type I.
