= Interleukin 36 receptor =

Protein found in humans

IL36R

Identifiers
- Aliases: IL36R, IL-1Rrp2, IL-36R, IL1R-rp2, IL1RRP2, interleukin 1 receptor like 2, IL1RL2, interleukin 36 receptor
- External IDs: OMIM: 604512; MGI: 1913107; GeneCards: IL36R
Enzyme activity
EC #	BRENDA	ExPASy	KEGG	MetaCyc
3.2.2.6	↗	↗	↗	↗

Gene location (Human)
Chr.	Chromosome 2 (human)
Band	2q12.1	Start	102,187,006 bp
Band	2q12.1	End	102,240,002 bp

Gene location (Mouse)
Chr.	Chromosome 1 (mouse)
Band	1|1 B	Start	40,363,770 bp
Band	1|1 B	End	40,406,722 bp
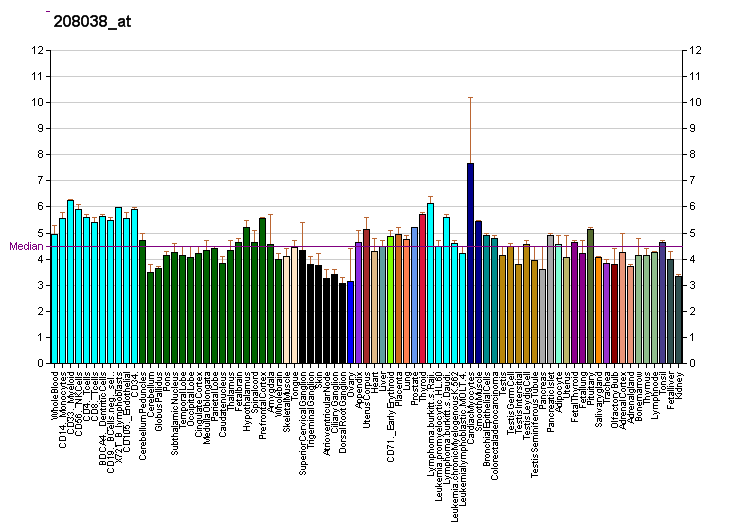
RNA expression pattern
Bgee	Human / Mouse (ortholog); Top expressed in: testicle; skin of abdomen; skin of leg; right lobe of thyroid gland; right lobe of liver; cartilage tissue; left lobe of thyroid gland; right uterine tube; minor salivary glands; mucosa of transverse colon / Top expressed in: lip; conjunctival fornix; gastrula; skin of external ear; skin of back; seminal vesicula; esophagus; epidermis; hair follicle; lacrimal gland; More reference expression data
BioGPS	More reference expression data
Gene ontology
Molecular function	interleukin-1, type I, activating receptor activity; interleukin-1 receptor activity
Cellular component	integral component of membrane; integral component of plasma membrane; membrane; plasma membrane
Biological process	positive regulation of T cell differentiation; immune system process; interleukin-1-mediated signaling pathway; cellular defense response; innate immune response; inflammatory response; signal transduction; regulation of inflammatory response; positive regulation of interleukin-6 production; cytokine-mediated signaling pathway; cellular response to cytokine stimulus
Sources:Amigo / QuickGO
Orthologs
Databases	NCBI: entry; OMA: entry
Species	Human	Mouse
Entrez	8808	107527
Ensembl	ENSG00000115598	ENSMUSG00000070942
UniProt	Q9HB29	Q9ERS7
RefSeq (mRNA)	NM_003854; NM_001351446; NM_001351447; NM_001351448; NM_001351449 NM_001351450	NM_133193; NM_001356478
RefSeq (protein)	NP_003845; NP_001338375; NP_001338376; NP_001338377; NP_001338378 NP_001338379	NP_573456; NP_001343407
Location (UCSC)	Chr 2: 102.19 – 102.24 Mb	Chr 1: 40.36 – 40.41 Mb
PubMed search
- Wikidata
View/Edit Human	View/Edit Mouse

Interleukin 36 receptor, previously called Interleukin-1 receptor-like 2, is a protein that in humans is encoded by the gene IL36R (previously IL1RL2). As its name suggests, this protein functions as a receptor for interleukin-36, which is thought to be involved in triggering an inflammatory response.

The protein encoded by this gene is a member of the interleukin 1 receptor family. An experiment with transient gene expression demonstrated that this receptor was incapable of binding to interleukin 1 alpha and interleukin 1 beta with high affinity. This gene and four other interleukin 1 receptor family genes, including interleukin 1 receptor, type I (IL1R1), interleukin 1 receptor, type II (IL1R2), interleukin 1 receptor-like 1 (IL1RL1), and interleukin 18 receptor 1 (IL18R1), form a cytokine receptor gene cluster in a region mapped to chromosome 2q12.
