= Toll-like receptor 11 =

Identifiers
- Organism: Mus Musculus
- Symbol: TLR11
- Orthologs: OMA: entry
- UniProt: Q6R5P0
Search for
- Structures: Swiss-model
- Domains: InterPro

Toll-like receptor 11 (TLR11) is a protein that in mice and rats is encoded by the gene TLR11, whereas in humans it is represented by a pseudogene. TLR11 belongs to the toll-like receptor (TLR) family and the interleukin-1 receptor/toll-like receptor superfamily and is found in the endosomes. In mice, TLR11 has been shown to recognise (bacterial) flagellin and (eukaryotic) profilin present on certain microbes on, it helps propagate a host immune response. TLR11 plays a fundamental role in both the innate and adaptive immune responses, through the activation of tumor necrosis factor-alpha, the interleukin 12 (IL-12) response, and interferon-gamma (IFN-gamma) secretion. TLR11 mounts an immune response to multiple microbes, including Toxoplasma gondii (T. gondii), Salmonella species, and uropathogenic E. coli, and likely many other species due to the highly conserved nature of flagellin and profilin.

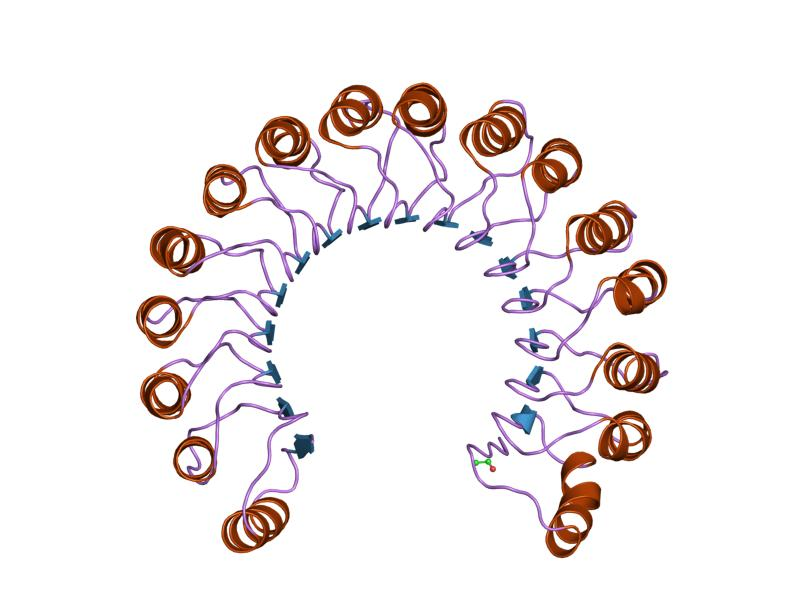
Leucine-rich repeat

== Structure and localization ==
Proteins in the TLR family are pattern recognition receptors whose task is to alert the immune system of foreign invaders. These foreign invaders may be bacteria, viruses, fungi, or parasites. Every TLR has three domains that compose its overall structure: a leucine-rich repeat (LRR) region, a transmembrane domain, and a Toll/Interleukin-1 receptor (TIR) domain. The LRR region of TLR11 interacts with the T. gondii profilin and uropathogenic E. coli. It is localized to the endosomal compartment of the cell with the LRR region facing into the endosome. The domain mounts TLR11 to the endosomal membrane and connects the LRR region to the TIR domain. Lastly, the TIR domain resides on the cytosolic side of the cell. Its job is to initiate a signal that will activate the Toll pathway in the cell. The ultimate end of the Toll pathway is the expression of genes by the transcription factors NF-κB and AP-1 that initiate an immune response to the pathogen.

TLR11 is expressed in macrophages, dendritic cells, and liver, kidney, and bladder epithelial cells.

== Function ==
Many mammals, including humans, have the TLR11 gene. But only some species' TLR11 can successfully code for the functional protein that is able to play an active role in the innate immune response. Human TLR11 contains premature stop codons, meaning functional TLR11 protein is not found in humans. All the collective knowledge about the function and immunopathology of TLR11 has come from experiments in other animals, often mice.

Experiments on mouse TLR11 both in vivo and in vitro have revealed much about the biological role of TLR11. TLR11 has a primary role as a "sentinel" for the innate immune system. Like all TLRs, TLR11 distinguishes between self molecules and non-self molecules. When an infection of T. gondii or uropathogenic E. coli reaches a host cell expressing TLR11 on its surface, the LRR region binds to the pathogen and activates the Toll pathway through the TIR domain. The transcription factor NF-kappa B at the end of the pathway transcribes pro-inflammatory cytokines (such as IL-12) and chemokines. Activation of the Toll pathway also results in the expression of co-stimulatory molecules on dendritic cells, which then go on to activate naïve CD4 cells in the lymph nodes.

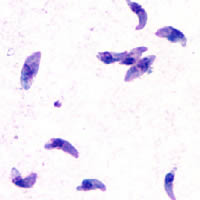
Toxoplasma gondii

== TLR11 and T. gondii ==
T. gondii is an apicomplexan parasite that can cause infection in humans. The parasite can live in many mammals and birds, but it carries out the sexual part of its lifecycle in cats. Feline feces from infected cats or undercooked meat from infected livestock contain T. gondii oocysts and tecidual cysts containing bradyzoites, respectively. Ingesting these could lead to toxoplasmosis, a disease which at its worst can cause encephalitis or miscarriage as the disease is passed from mother to fetus.

T. gondii and other apicomplexan parasites rely on actin-dependent gliding motility in order to gain access to the body. This form of cellular motion requires profilin, an actin filament binding protein that helps restructure the actin cytoskeleton. Without profilin, T. gondii can still grow and replicate, but it loses the ability to pass through cell layers and biological barriers in order to carry out infection. Thus profilin is a conserved, essential protein for T. gondii infection efficacy.

Profilin from T. gondii is a critical parasite ligand for TLR11. It preferentially induces IL-12 production in dendritic cells that communicate with natural killer cells and cytotoxic T cells. In one study, mice bred to not express TLR11 (knock-out mice) did not mount the IL-12 response upon profilin stimulation. Dendritic cells in the knock-out mice also failed to migrate to lymph nodes, halting the initiation of the adaptive immune response.

Furthermore, mice lacking the TLR11 gene are susceptible to pancreatitis, fat cell necrosis, and increased inflammatory reactants. Pancreatitis is also a pathological response in humans to T. gondii infection. Wild-type mice are able to produce an immune response, marked by IL-12 and IFN-gamma production that is unseen in humans, who lack a functional TLR11 protein.

== TLR11 and uropathogenic E. coli ==
Uropathogenic E. coli is a bacterium that causes urinary tract infections. The infection begins with colonization in the urethra. The infection typically ascends and can reside primarily in the bladder or the kidneys, though the latter is more threatening due to the possibility of transmission of pathogens to the bloodstream.

TLR11 is expressed in mouse kidney and bladder epithelial cells, the cells that line the urinary tract and protect the underlying tissue. In another study of TLR11 in mice, exposure of human uropathogenic E. coli bacteria to mouse cells expressing TLR11 resulted in NF-kappa B activation. While the bladders from both wild-type and knockout mice were almost equally infected, the kidneys of the mice without TLR11 had 10,000 times more bacteria and showed a greater inflammatory response than the normal mouse kidneys. TLR11 appears to recognize a pattern on uropathogenic E. coli and can prevent ascending infection.

Mice as a species do not grapple with urinary tract infections like humans do unless some part of their TLR11 immune response is made non-functional. With functional TLR11, humans might not succumb to urinary tract infections so readily.
