= Toll-like receptor =

Class of immune system proteins

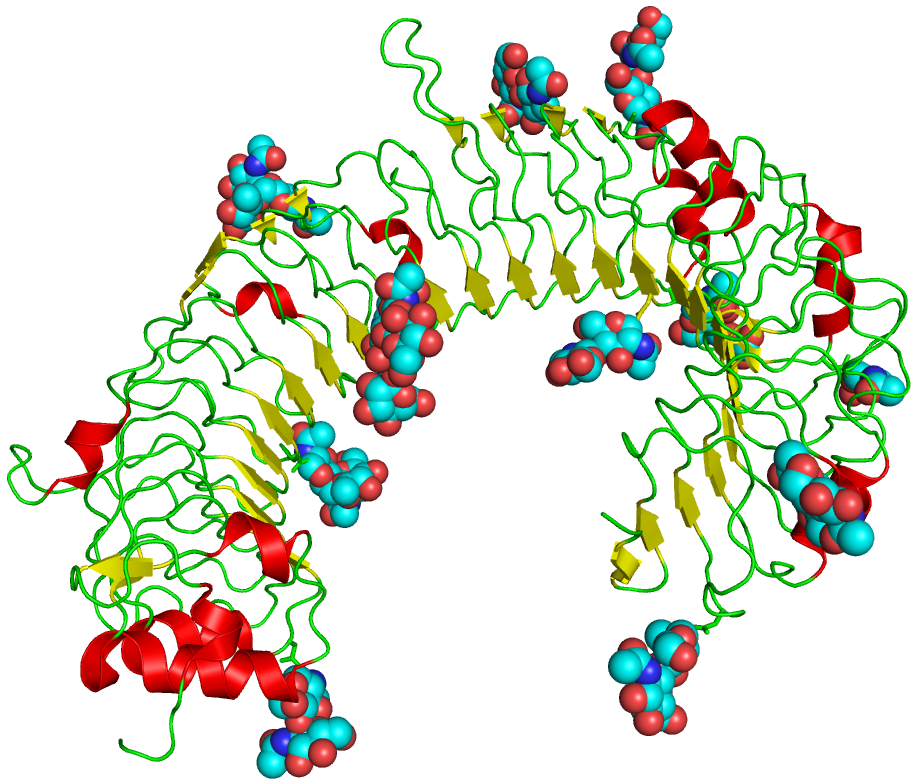
- The curved leucine-rich repeat region of toll-like receptors, represented here by TLR3

Identifiers
- Symbol: Toll-like receptor
- Membranome: 7

Toll-like receptors (TLRs) are a class of proteins that play a key role in the innate immune system. They are single-spanning receptors usually expressed on sentinel cells such as macrophages and dendritic cells, that recognize structurally conserved molecules derived from microbes. Once these microbes have reached physical barriers such as the skin or intestinal tract mucosa, they are recognized by TLRs, which activate immune cell responses. The TLRs include TLR1, TLR2, TLR3, TLR4, TLR5, TLR6, TLR7, TLR8, TLR9, TLR10, TLR11, TLR12, and TLR13. Humans lack genes for TLR11, TLR12 and TLR13 and mice lack a functional gene for TLR10. The receptors TLR1, TLR2, TLR4, TLR5, TLR6, and TLR10 are located on the cell membrane, whereas TLR3, TLR7, TLR8, and TLR9 are located in intracellular vesicles (because they are sensors of nucleic acids).

TLRs received their name from their similarity to the protein coded by the toll gene.

== Function ==
The ability of the immune system to recognize molecules that are broadly shared by pathogens is, in part, due to the presence of immune receptors called toll-like receptors (TLRs) that are expressed on the membranes of leukocytes including dendritic cells, macrophages, natural killer cells, cells of the adaptive immunity T cells, and B cells, and non-immune cells (epithelial and endothelial cells, and fibroblasts).

The binding of ligands — either in the form of adjuvant used in vaccinations or in the form of invasive moieties during times of natural infection — to the TLR marks the key molecular events that ultimately lead to innate immune responses and the development of antigen-specific acquired immunity.

Upon activation, TLRs recruit adaptor proteins (proteins that mediate other protein-protein interactions) within the cytosol of the immune cell to propagate the antigen-induced signal transduction pathway. These recruited proteins are then responsible for the subsequent activation of other downstream proteins, including protein kinases (IKKi, IRAK1, IRAK4, and TBK1) that further amplify the signal and ultimately lead to the upregulation or suppression of genes that orchestrate inflammatory responses and other transcriptional events. Some of these events lead to cytokine production, proliferation, and survival, while others lead to greater adaptive immunity. If the ligand is a bacterial factor, the pathogen might be phagocytosed and digested, and its antigens presented to CD4+ T cells. In the case of a viral factor, the infected cell may shut off its protein synthesis and may undergo programmed cell death (apoptosis). Immune cells that have detected a virus may also release anti-viral factors such as interferons.

Toll-like receptors have also been shown to be an important link between Innate immune system and adaptive immune system through their presence in dendritic cells. Flagellin, a TLR5 ligand, induces cytokine secretion on interacting with TLR5 on human T cells.

== Superfamily ==
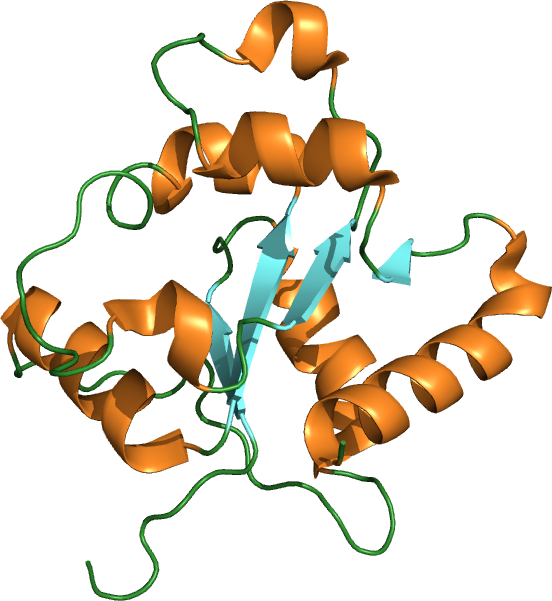
TIR domain from TLR2. This is a signal transduction domain distinct from the LRR domain discussed earlier.

TLRs are a type of pattern recognition receptor (PRR) and recognize molecules that are broadly shared by pathogens but distinguishable from host molecules, collectively referred to as pathogen-associated molecular patterns (PAMPs). In addition to the recognition of exogenous PAMPs, TLRs can also bind to endogenous damage-associated molecular patterns (DAMPs) such as heat shock proteins (HSPs) or plasma membrane constituents. TLRs together with the Interleukin-1 receptors form a receptor superfamily, known as the "interleukin-1 receptor / toll-like receptor superfamily"; all members of this family have in common a so-called TIR (toll-IL-1 receptor) domain.

Three subgroups of TIR domains exist. Proteins with subgroup 1 TIR domains are receptors for interleukins that are produced by macrophages, monocytes, and dendritic cells and all have extracellular Immunoglobulin (Ig) domains. Proteins with subgroup 2 TIR domains are classical TLRs, and bind directly or indirectly to molecules of microbial origin. A third subgroup of proteins containing TIR domains consists of adaptor proteins that are exclusively cytosolic and mediate signaling from proteins of subgroups 1 and 2.

== Extended family ==
TLRs are present in vertebrates as well as invertebrates. Molecular building blocks of the TLRs are represented in bacteria and in plants, and plant pattern recognition receptors are well known to be required for host defence against infection. The TLRs thus appear to be one of the most ancient, conserved components of the immune system.

In recent years TLRs were identified also in the mammalian nervous system. Members of the TLR family were detected on glia, neurons and on neural progenitor cells in which they regulate cell-fate decision.

It has been estimated that most mammalian species have between ten and fifteen types of toll-like receptors. Thirteen TLRs (named simply TLR1 to TLR13) have been identified in humans and mice together, and equivalent forms of many of these have been found in other mammalian species. However, equivalents of certain TLR found in humans are not present in all mammals. For example, a gene coding for a protein analogous to TLR10 in humans is present in mice, but appears to have been damaged at some point in the past by a retrovirus. On the other hand, mice express TLRs 11, 12, and 13, none of which is represented in humans. Other mammals may express TLRs that are not found in humans. Other non-mammalian species may have TLRs distinct from mammals, as demonstrated by the anti-cell-wall TLR14, which is found in the Takifugu pufferfish. This may complicate the process of using experimental animals as models of human innate immunity.

Vertebrate TLRs are divided by similarity into the families of TLR 1/2/6/10/14/15, TLR 3, TLR 4, TLR 5, TLR 7/8/9, and TLR 11/12/13/16/21/22/23.

=== TLRs in Drosophila immunity ===
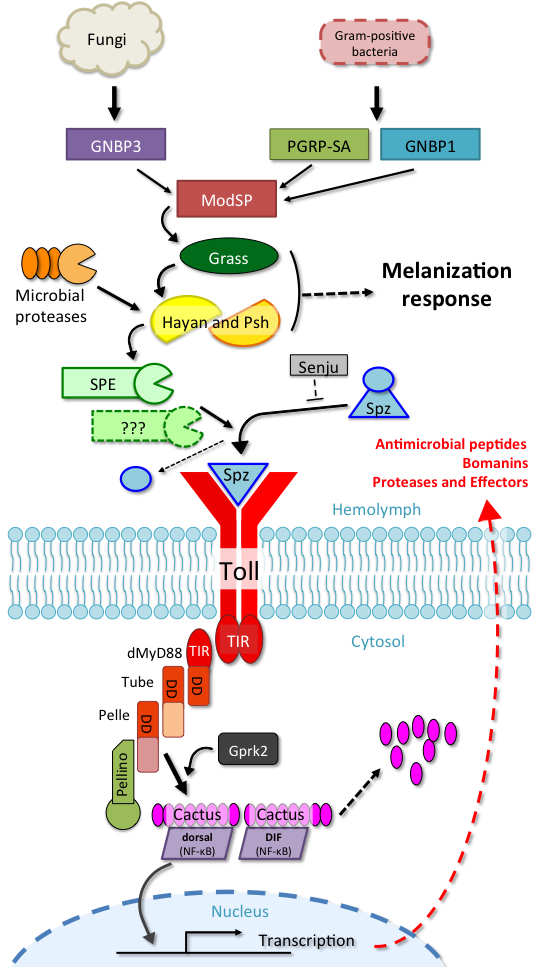
The Toll immunity pathway as found in the fruit fly

The involvement of toll signalling in immunity was first demonstrated in the fruit fly, Drosophila melanogaster. Fruit flies have only innate immune responses allowing studies to avoid interference of adaptive immune mechanisms on signal transduction. The fly response to fungal or bacterial infection occurs through two distinct signalling cascades, one of which is the toll pathway and the other is the immune deficiency pathway. The toll pathway is similar to mammalian TLR signalling, but unlike mammalian TLRs, Toll is not activated directly by pathogen-associated molecular patterns (PAMPs). Its receptor ectodomain recognizes the cleaved form of the cytokine spätzle, which is secreted in the haemolymph as an inactive dimeric precursor. The toll receptor shares the cytoplasmatic TIR domain with mammalian TLRs, but the ectodomain and intracytoplasmatic tail are different. This difference might reflect a function of these receptors as cytokine receptors rather than PRRs.

The Toll pathway is activated by different stimuli, such as gram-positive bacteria, fungi, and virulence factors. First, the Spätzle processing enzyme (SPE) is activated in response to infection and cleaves spätzle (spz). Cleaved spätzle then binds to the toll receptor and crosslinks its ectodomains. This triggers conformational changes in the receptor resulting in signaling through Toll. From this point forward, the signalling cascade is very similar to mammalian signalling through TLRs. The Toll-induced signaling complex (TICS) is composed of MyD88, Tube, and Pelle (the orthologue of mammalian IRAK). Signal from TICS is then transduced to Cactus (homologue of mammalian IκB), phosphorylated Cactus is polyubiquitylated and degraded, allowing nuclear translocation of DIF (dorsal-related immunity factor; a homologue of mammalian NF-κB) and induction of transcription of genes for antimicrobial peptides (AMPs) such as drosomycin.

Drosophila have a total of 9 Toll family and 6 spz family genes that interact with each other to differing degrees.

=== TLR2 ===
TLR2 has also been designated as CD282 (cluster of differentiation 282).

=== TLR3 ===
TLR3 does not use the MyD88 dependent pathway. Its ligand is retroviral double-stranded RNA (dsRNA), which activates the TRIF dependent signalling pathway. To explore the role of this pathway in retroviral reprograming, knock down techniques of TLR3 or TRIF were prepared, and results showed that only the TLR3 pathway is required for full induction of target gene expression by the retrovirus expression vector. This retroviral expression of four transcriptional factors (Oct4, Sox2, Klf4 and c-Myc; OSKM) induces pluripotency in somatic cells. This is supported by study, which shows, that efficiency and amount of human iPSC generation, using retroviral vectors, is reduced by knockdown of the pathway with peptide inhibitors or shRNA knockdown of TLR3 or its adaptor protein TRIF. Taken together, stimulation of TLR3 causes great changes in chromatin remodeling and nuclear reprogramming, and activation of inflammatory pathways is required for these changes, induction of pluripotency genes and generation of human induced pluripotent stem cells (iPSC) colonies.

=== TLR11 ===
As noted above, human cells do not express TLR11, but mice cells do. Mouse-specific TLR11 recognizes uropathogenic E.coli and the apicomplexan parasite Toxoplasma gondii. With Toxoplasma its ligand is the protein profilin and the ligand for E. coli is flagellin. The flagellin from the enteropathogen Salmonella is also recognized by TLR11.

As mouse TLR11 is able to recognize Salmonella effectively, normal mice do not get infected by oral Salmonella Typhi, which causes food- and waterborne gastroenteritis and typhoid fever in humans. TLR11 deficient knockout mice, on the other hand, are efficiently infected. As a result, this knockout mouse can act as a disease model of human typhoid fever.

== Summary of known mammalian TLRs ==
Toll-like receptors bind and become activated by different ligands, which, in turn, are located on different types of organisms or structures. They also have different adapters to respond to activation and are located sometimes at the cell surface and sometimes to internal cell compartments. Furthermore, they are expressed by different types of leucocytes or other cell types:

Receptor	Ligand(s)	Ligand location	Adapter(s)	Location	Cell types
TLR 1	multiple triacyl lipopeptides	Bacterial lipoprotein	MyD88/MAL	cell surface	monocytes/macrophages; a subset of dendritic cells; B lymphocytes
TLR 2	multiple glycolipids	Bacterial peptidoglycans	MyD88/MAL	cell surface	monocytes/macrophages; neutrophils; Myeloid dendritic cells; Mast cells
TLR 2	multiple lipopeptides and proteolipids	Bacterial peptidoglycans	MyD88/MAL	cell surface	monocytes/macrophages; neutrophils; Myeloid dendritic cells; Mast cells
TLR 2	lipoteichoic acid	Gram-positive bacteria	MyD88/MAL	cell surface	monocytes/macrophages; neutrophils; Myeloid dendritic cells; Mast cells
TLR 2	HSP70	Host cells	MyD88/MAL	cell surface	monocytes/macrophages; neutrophils; Myeloid dendritic cells; Mast cells
TLR 2	zymosan (Beta-glucan)	Fungi	MyD88/MAL	cell surface	monocytes/macrophages; neutrophils; Myeloid dendritic cells; Mast cells
TLR 2	Numerous others		MyD88/MAL	cell surface	monocytes/macrophages; neutrophils; Myeloid dendritic cells; Mast cells
TLR 3	double-stranded RNA, poly I:C	viruses	TRIF	cell compartment	Dendritic cells; B lymphocytes
TLR 4	lipopolysaccharide	Gram-negative bacteria	MyD88/MAL/TRIF/TRAM	cell surface	monocytes/macrophages; neutrophils; Myeloid dendritic cells; Mast cells; B lymphocytes (only in mice); Intestinal epithelium; Breast cancer cells
TLR 4	several heat shock proteins	Bacteria and host cells	MyD88/MAL/TRIF/TRAM	cell surface	monocytes/macrophages; neutrophils; Myeloid dendritic cells; Mast cells; B lymphocytes (only in mice); Intestinal epithelium; Breast cancer cells
TLR 4	fibrinogen	host cells	MyD88/MAL/TRIF/TRAM	cell surface	monocytes/macrophages; neutrophils; Myeloid dendritic cells; Mast cells; B lymphocytes (only in mice); Intestinal epithelium; Breast cancer cells
TLR 4	heparan sulfate fragments	host cells	MyD88/MAL/TRIF/TRAM	cell surface	monocytes/macrophages; neutrophils; Myeloid dendritic cells; Mast cells; B lymphocytes (only in mice); Intestinal epithelium; Breast cancer cells
TLR 4	hyaluronic acid fragments	host cells	MyD88/MAL/TRIF/TRAM	cell surface	monocytes/macrophages; neutrophils; Myeloid dendritic cells; Mast cells; B lymphocytes (only in mice); Intestinal epithelium; Breast cancer cells
TLR 4	nickel		MyD88/MAL/TRIF/TRAM	cell surface	monocytes/macrophages; neutrophils; Myeloid dendritic cells; Mast cells; B lymphocytes (only in mice); Intestinal epithelium; Breast cancer cells
TLR 4	Various opioid drugs		MyD88/MAL/TRIF/TRAM	cell surface	monocytes/macrophages; neutrophils; Myeloid dendritic cells; Mast cells; B lymphocytes (only in mice); Intestinal epithelium; Breast cancer cells
TLR 5	Bacterial flagellin	Bacteria	MyD88	cell surface	monocyte/macrophages; a subset of dendritic cells; Intestinal epithelium; Breast cancer cells; B lymphocytes
TLR 5	Profilin	Toxoplasma gondii	MyD88	cell surface	monocyte/macrophages; a subset of dendritic cells; Intestinal epithelium; Breast cancer cells; B lymphocytes
TLR 6	multiple diacyl lipopeptides	Mycoplasma	MyD88/MAL	cell surface	monocytes/macrophages; Mast cells; B lymphocytes
TLR 7	imidazoquinoline	small synthetic compounds	MyD88	cell compartment	monocytes/macrophages; Plasmacytoid dendritic cells; B lymphocytes
TLR 7	loxoribine (a guanosine analogue)	small synthetic compounds	MyD88	cell compartment	monocytes/macrophages; Plasmacytoid dendritic cells; B lymphocytes
TLR 7	bropirimine	small synthetic compounds	MyD88	cell compartment	monocytes/macrophages; Plasmacytoid dendritic cells; B lymphocytes
TLR 7	resiquimod	small synthetic compounds	MyD88	cell compartment	monocytes/macrophages; Plasmacytoid dendritic cells; B lymphocytes
TLR 7	single-stranded RNA	RNA viruses	MyD88	cell compartment	monocytes/macrophages; Plasmacytoid dendritic cells; B lymphocytes
TLR 8	small synthetic compounds; single-stranded Viral RNA, phagocytized bacterial RNA(24)		MyD88	cell compartment	monocytes/macrophages; a subset of dendritic cells; Mast cells; Intestinal epithelial cells (IECs) *only in Crohn's or ulcerative colitis; hippocampal interneurons
TLR 9	unmethylated CpG Oligodeoxynucleotide DNA	Bacteria, DNA viruses	MyD88	cell compartment	monocytes/macrophages; Plasmacytoid dendritic cells; B lymphocytes
TLR 10	triacylated lipopeptides		unknown	cell surface	B cells; Intestinal epitelial cells; monocytes/macrophages
TLR 11	Profilin	Toxoplasma gondii	MyD88	cell compartment	monocytes/macrophages; liver cells; kidney; urinary bladder epithelium
TLR 11	Flagellin	Bacteria (E. coli, Salmonella)	MyD88	cell compartment	monocytes/macrophages; liver cells; kidney; urinary bladder epithelium
TLR 12	Profilin	Toxoplasma gondii	MyD88	cell compartment	Neurons; plasmacytoid dendritic cells; conventional dendritic cells; macrophages
TLR 13	bacterial ribosomal RNA sequence "CGGAAAGACC" (but not the methylated version)	Virus, bacteria	MyD88, TAK-1	cell compartment	monocytes/macrophages; conventional dendritic cells

== Ligands ==
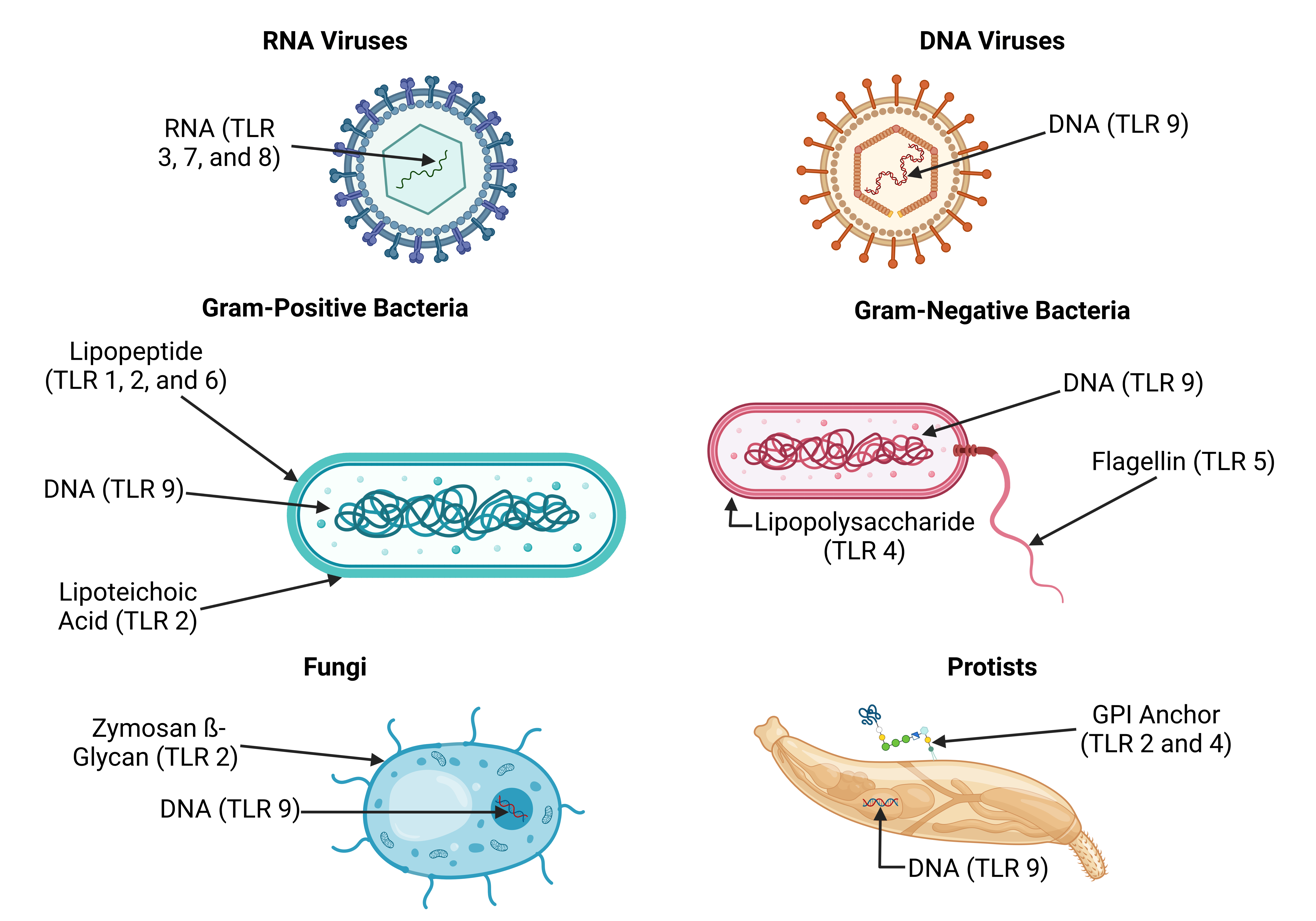
Toll-Like Receptor (TLR) ligands among RNA and DNA viruses, Gram-positive and Gram-negative bacteria, fungi, and protists

Because of the specificity of toll-like receptors (and other innate immune receptors) they cannot easily be changed in the course of evolution, these receptors recognize molecules that are constantly associated with threats (i.e., pathogen or cell stress) and are highly specific to these threats (i.e., cannot be mistaken for self molecules that are normally expressed under physiological conditions). Pathogen-associated molecules that meet this requirement are thought to be critical to the pathogen's function and difficult to change through mutation; they are said to be evolutionarily conserved. Somewhat conserved features in pathogens include bacterial cell-surface lipopolysaccharides (LPS), lipoproteins, lipopeptides, and lipoarabinomannan; proteins such as flagellin from bacterial flagella; double-stranded RNA of viruses; or the unmethylated CpG islands of bacterial and viral DNA; and also of the CpG islands found in the promoters of eukaryotic DNA; as well as certain other RNA and DNA molecules. As TLR ligands are present in most pathogens, they may also be present in pathogen-derived vaccines (e.g. MMR, influenza, polio vaccines) most commercially available vaccines have been assessed for their inherent TLR ligands' capacity to activate distinct subsets of immune cells. For most of the TLRs, ligand recognition specificity has now been established by gene targeting (also known as "gene knockout"): a technique by which individual genes may be selectively deleted in mice. See the table above for a summary of known TLR ligands.

=== Endogenous ligands ===
The stereotypic inflammatory response provoked by toll-like receptor activation has prompted speculation that endogenous activators of toll-like receptors might participate in autoimmune diseases. TLRs have been suspected of binding to host molecules including fibrinogen (involved in blood clotting), heat shock proteins (HSPs), HMGB1, extracellular matrix components and self DNA (it is normally degraded by nucleases, but under inflammatory and autoimmune conditions it can form a complex with endogenous proteins, become resistant to these nucleases and gain access to endosomal TLRs as TLR7 or TLR9). These endogenous ligands are usually produced as a result of non-physiological cell death.

== Signaling ==
Signaling pathway of toll-like receptors. Dashed grey lines represent unknown associations.

TLRs are believed to function as dimers. Though most TLRs appear to function as homodimers, TLR2 forms heterodimers with TLR1 or TLR6, each dimer having a different ligand specificity. TLRs may also depend on other co-receptors for full ligand sensitivity, such as in the case of TLR4's recognition of LPS, which requires MD-2. CD14 and LPS-Binding Protein (LBP) are known to facilitate the presentation of LPS to MD-2.

A set of endosomal TLRs comprising TLR3, TLR7, TLR8 and TLR9 recognize nucleic acid derived from viruses as well as endogenous nucleic acids in context of pathogenic events. Activation of these receptor leads to production of inflammatory cytokines as well as type I interferons (interferon type I) to help fight viral infection.

The adapter proteins and kinases that mediate TLR signaling have also been targeted. In addition, random germline mutagenesis with ENU has been used to decipher the TLR signaling pathways. When activated, TLRs recruit adapter molecules within the cytoplasm of cells to propagate a signal. Four adapter molecules are known to be involved in signaling. These proteins are known as MyD88, TIRAP (also called Mal), TRIF, and TRAM (TRIF-related adaptor molecule).

TLR signaling is divided into two distinct signaling pathways, the MyD88-dependent and TRIF-dependent pathway.

=== MyD88-dependent pathway ===
The MyD88-dependent response occurs on dimerization of TLRs, and is used by every TLR except TLR3. Its primary effect is activation of NFκB and mitogen-activated protein kinase. Ligand binding and conformational change that occurs in the receptor recruits the adaptor protein MyD88, a member of the TIR family. MyD88 then recruits IRAK4, IRAK1 and IRAK2. IRAK kinases then phosphorylate and activate the protein TRAF6, which in turn polyubiquinates the protein TAK1, as well as itself to facilitate binding to IKK-β. On binding, TAK1 phosphorylates IKK-β, which then phosphorylates IκB causing its degradation and allowing NFκB to diffuse into the cell nucleus and activate transcription and consequent induction of inflammatory cytokines.

=== TRIF-dependent pathway ===
Both TLR3 and TLR4 use the TRIF-dependent pathway, which is triggered by dsRNA and LPS, respectively. For TLR3, dsRNA leads to activation of the receptor, recruiting the adaptor TRIF. TRIF activates the kinases TBK1 and RIPK1, which creates a branch in the signaling pathway. The TRIF/TBK1 signaling complex phosphorylates IRF3 allowing its translocation into the nucleus and production of interferon type I. Meanwhile, activation of RIPK1 causes the polyubiquitination and activation of TAK1 and NFκB transcription in the same manner as the MyD88-dependent pathway.

TLR signaling ultimately leads to the induction or suppression of genes that orchestrate the inflammatory response. In all, thousands of genes are activated by TLR signaling, and collectively, the TLRs constitute one of the most pleiotropic yet tightly regulated gateways for gene modulation.

TLR4 is the only TLR that uses all four adaptors. Complex consisting of TLR4, MD2 and LPS recruits TIR domain-containing adaptors TIRAP and MyD88 and thus initiates activation of NFκB (early phase) and MAPK. TLR4-MD2-LPS complex then undergoes endocytosis and in endosome it forms a signaling complex with TRAM and TRIF adaptors. This TRIF-dependent pathway again leads to IRF3 activation and production of type I interferons, but it also activates late-phase NFκB activation. Both late and early phase activation of NFκB is required for production of inflammatory cytokines.

== Medical relevance ==
Imiquimod (cardinally used in dermatology) is a TLR7 agonist, and its successor resiquimod, is a TLR7 and TLR8 agonist. Recently, resiquimod has been explored as an agent for cancer immunotherapy, acting through stimulation of tumor-associated macrophages.

Several TLR ligands are in clinical development or being tested in animal models as vaccine adjuvants, with the first clinical use in humans in a recombinant herpes zoster vaccine in 2017, which contains a monophosphoryl lipid A component.

TLR7 messenger RNA expression levels in dairy animals in a natural outbreak of foot-and-mouth disease have been reported.

TLR4 has been shown to be important for the long-term side-effects of opioids. Its activation leads to downstream release of inflammatory modulators including TNF-α and IL-1β, and constant low-level release of these modulators is thought to reduce the efficacy of opioid drug treatment with time, and is involved in opioid tolerance, hyperalgesia and allodynia. Morphine induced TLR4 activation attenuates pain suppression by opioids and enhances the development of opioid tolerance and addiction, drug abuse, and other negative side effects such as respiratory depression and hyperalgesia. Drugs that block the action of TNF-α or IL-1β have been shown to increase the analgesic effects of opioids and reduce the development of tolerance and other side-effects, and this has also been demonstrated with drugs that block TLR4 itself.

The "unnatural" enantiomers of opioid drugs such as (+)-morphine and (+)-naloxone lack affinity for opioid receptors, still produce the same activity at TLR4 as their "normal" enantiomers. So, "unnatural" entianomers of opioids such as (+)-naloxone, can be used to block the TLR4 activity of opioid analgesic drugs without having any affinity for μ-opioid receptor

== Discovery ==
When microbes were first recognized as the cause of infectious diseases, it was immediately clear that multicellular organisms must be capable of recognizing them when infected and, hence, capable of recognizing molecules unique to microbes. A large body of literature, spanning most of the last century, attests to the search for the key molecules and their receptors. More than 100 years ago, Richard Pfeiffer, a student of Robert Koch, coined the term "endotoxin" to describe a substance produced by Gram-negative bacteria that could provoke fever and shock in experimental animals. In the decades that followed, endotoxin was chemically characterized and identified as a lipopolysaccharide (LPS) produced by most Gram-negative bacteria. This lipopolysaccharide is an integral part of the gram-negative membrane and is released upon destruction of the bacterium. Other molecules (bacterial lipopeptides, flagellin, and unmethylated DNA) were shown in turn to provoke host responses that are normally protective. However, these responses can be detrimental if they are excessively prolonged or intense. It followed logically that there must be receptors for such molecules, capable of alerting the host to the presence of infection, but these remained elusive for many years. Toll-like receptors are now counted among the key molecules that alert the immune system to the presence of microbial infections.

The prototypic member of the family, the toll receptor (P08953; Tl) in the fruit fly Drosophila melanogaster, was discovered in 1985 by 1995 Nobel Laureates Christiane Nüsslein-Volhard and Eric Wieschaus and colleagues. It was known for its developmental function in embryogenesis by establishing the dorsal-ventral axis. It was named after Christiane Nüsslein-Volhard's 1985 exclamation, "Das ist ja toll!" ("That's amazing!"), in reference to the underdeveloped ventral portion of a fruit fly larva. It was cloned by the laboratory of Kathryn Anderson in 1988. In 1996, toll was found by Jules A. Hoffmann and his colleagues to have an essential role in the fly's immunity to fungal infection, which it achieved by activating the synthesis of antimicrobial peptides.

The first reported human toll-like receptor was described by Nomura and colleagues in 1994, mapped to a chromosome by Taguchi and colleagues in 1996. Because the immune function of toll in Drosophila was not then known, it was assumed that TIL (now known as TLR1) might participate in mammalian development. However, in 1991 (prior to the discovery of TIL) it was observed that a molecule with a clear role in immune function in mammals, the interleukin-1 (IL-1) receptor, also had homology to drosophila toll; the cytoplasmic portions of both molecules were similar.

In 1997, Charles Janeway and Ruslan Medzhitov showed that a toll-like receptor now known as TLR4 could, when artificially ligated using antibodies, induce the activation of certain genes necessary for initiating an adaptive immune response. TLR 4 function as an LPS sensing receptor was discovered by Bruce A. Beutler and colleagues. These workers used positional cloning to prove that mice that could not respond to LPS had mutations that abolished the function of TLR4. This identified TLR4 as one of the key components of the receptor for LPS.

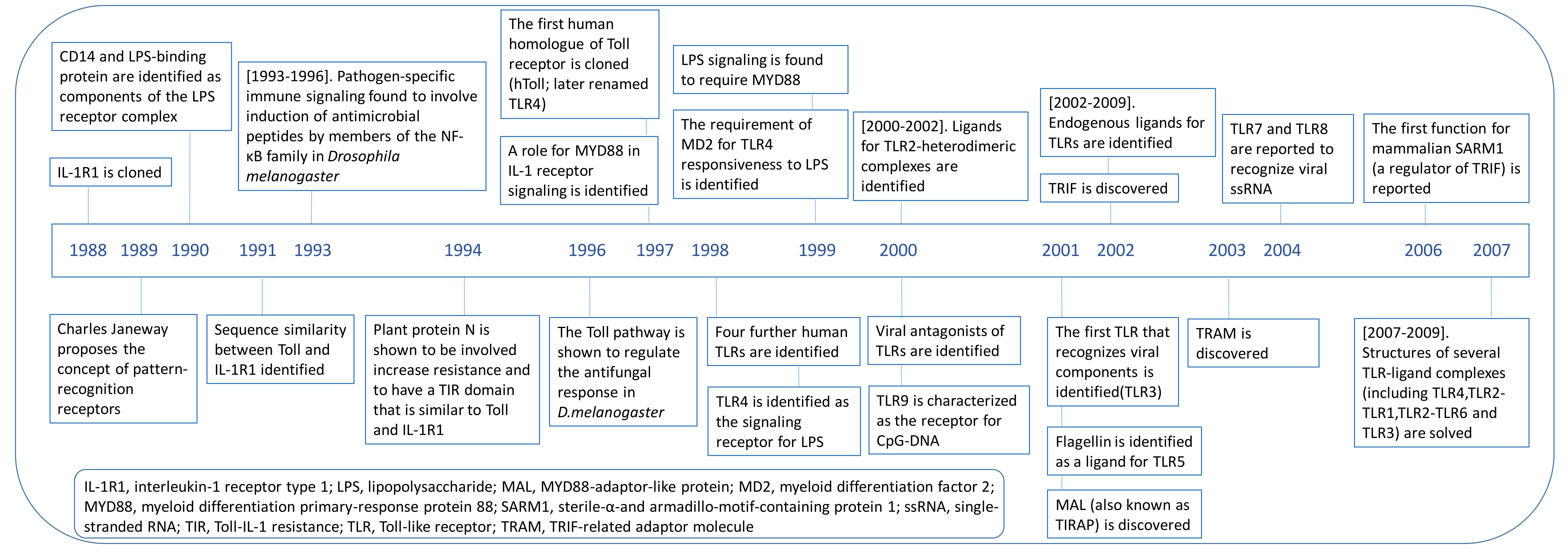
The history of Toll-like receptors

In turn, the other TLR genes were ablated in mice by gene targeting, largely in the laboratory of Shizuo Akira and colleagues. Each TLR is now believed to detect a discrete collection of molecules — some of microbial origin, and some products of cell damage — and to signal the presence of infections.

Plant homologs of toll were discovered by Pamela Ronald in 1995 (rice XA21) and Thomas Boller in 2000 (Arabidopsis FLS2).

In 2011, Beutler and Hoffmann were awarded the Nobel Prize in Physiology or Medicine for their work. Hoffmann and Akira received the Canada Gairdner International Award in 2011.

== See also ==
- NOD-like receptor
- Immunologic adjuvant
- RIG-I-like receptor
