= TIRAP =

Protein-coding gene in the species Homo sapiens

Identifiers
- Aliases: TIRAP, BACTS1, Mal, MyD88-2, wyatt, toll-interleukin 1 receptor (TIR) domain containing adaptor protein, TIR domain containing adaptor protein
- External IDs: OMIM: 606252; MGI: 2152213; GeneCards: TIRAP
Available structures
PDB	Ortholog search: PDBe RCSB
PDB	List of PDB id codes 2Y92, 3UB2, 3UB3, 3UB4, 4FZ5, 4LQD

Gene location (Human)
Chr.	Chromosome 11 (human)
Band	11q24.2	Start	126,283,065 bp
Band	11q24.2	End	126,298,845 bp

Gene location (Mouse)
Chr.	Chromosome 9 (mouse)
Band	9|9 A4	Start	35,095,847 bp
Band	9|9 A4	End	35,111,587 bp
RNA expression pattern
Bgee	Human / Mouse (ortholog); Top expressed in: buccal mucosa cell; monocyte; bone marrow cell; islet of Langerhans; rectum; smooth muscle tissue; left ovary; right ovary; right lobe of liver; minor salivary glands / Top expressed in: granulocyte; triceps brachii muscle; vastus lateralis muscle; muscle of thigh; conjunctival fornix; sternocleidomastoid muscle; primitive streak; temporal muscle; knee joint; parotid gland; More reference expression data
BioGPS	n/a
Gene ontology
Molecular function	protein-macromolecule adaptor activity; protein homodimerization activity; Toll-like receptor 2 binding; Toll-like receptor 4 binding; protein binding; protein heterodimerization activity; phosphatidylinositol-4,5-bisphosphate binding; protein kinase C binding; identical protein binding
Cellular component	cytoplasm; cytosol; membrane; plasma membrane; endocytic vesicle; ruffle membrane
Biological process	myeloid cell differentiation; regulation of innate immune response; cellular response to bacterial lipopeptide; positive regulation of toll-like receptor 3 signaling pathway; positive regulation of interleukin-12 production; positive regulation of chemokine (C-X-C motif) ligand 1 production; positive regulation of chemokine (C-X-C motif) ligand 2 production; immune system process; positive regulation of JNK cascade; MyD88-dependent toll-like receptor signaling pathway; positive regulation of interleukin-15 production; positive regulation of protein homodimerization activity; cell surface receptor signaling pathway; response to lipopolysaccharide; TIRAP-dependent toll-like receptor 4 signaling pathway; cellular response to lipoteichoic acid; positive regulation of B cell proliferation; regulation of interferon-beta production; positive regulation of NF-kappaB transcription factor activity; positive regulation of interleukin-8 production; positive regulation of ERK1 and ERK2 cascade; positive regulation of neutrophil chemotaxis; positive regulation of tumor necrosis factor production; positive regulation of toll-like receptor 4 signaling pathway; positive regulation of I-kappaB kinase/NF-kappaB signaling; positive regulation of toll-like receptor 2 signaling pathway; 3'-UTR-mediated mRNA stabilization; inflammatory response; signal transduction; defense response to Gram-positive bacterium; innate immune response; activation of NF-kappaB-inducing kinase activity
Sources:Amigo / QuickGO
Orthologs
Databases	NCBI: entry; OMA: entry
Species	Human	Mouse
Entrez	114609	117149
Ensembl	ENSG00000150455	ENSMUSG00000032041
UniProt	P58753	Q99JY1
RefSeq (mRNA)	NM_001039661; NM_052887; NM_148910; NM_001318776; NM_001318777	NM_001177845; NM_001177846; NM_001177847; NM_054096
RefSeq (protein)	NP_001034750; NP_001305705; NP_001305706; NP_683708	NP_001171316; NP_001171317; NP_001171318; NP_473437
Location (UCSC)	Chr 11: 126.28 – 126.3 Mb	Chr 9: 35.1 – 35.11 Mb
PubMed search
- Wikidata
View/Edit Human	View/Edit Mouse

TIRAP (TIR domain containing adaptor protein), also known as MAL (MyD88 adaptor-like protein) is an adapter protein associated with Toll-like receptors (TLRs), specifically TLR2 and TLR4. The innate immune system recognizes microbial pathogens through Toll-like receptors (TLRs), which identify pathogen-associated molecular patterns. Different TLRs recognize different pathogen-associated molecular patterns and all TLRs have a Toll-interleukin 1 receptor (TIR) domain, which is responsible for signal transduction. The protein encoded by this gene is a TIR adaptor protein involved in the TLR4 signaling pathway of the immune system. In TLR2 and TLR4, TIRAP is required for the MyD88-dependent pathway of immune signalling. In TLR2 and TLR4 signalling, TIRAP facilitates MyD88 recruitment which allows for downstream activation of NF-kappa-B, MAPK1, MAPK3 and JNK, which then results in cytokine secretion and the inflammatory response. Alternative splicing of this gene results in several transcript variants; however, not all variants have been fully described.

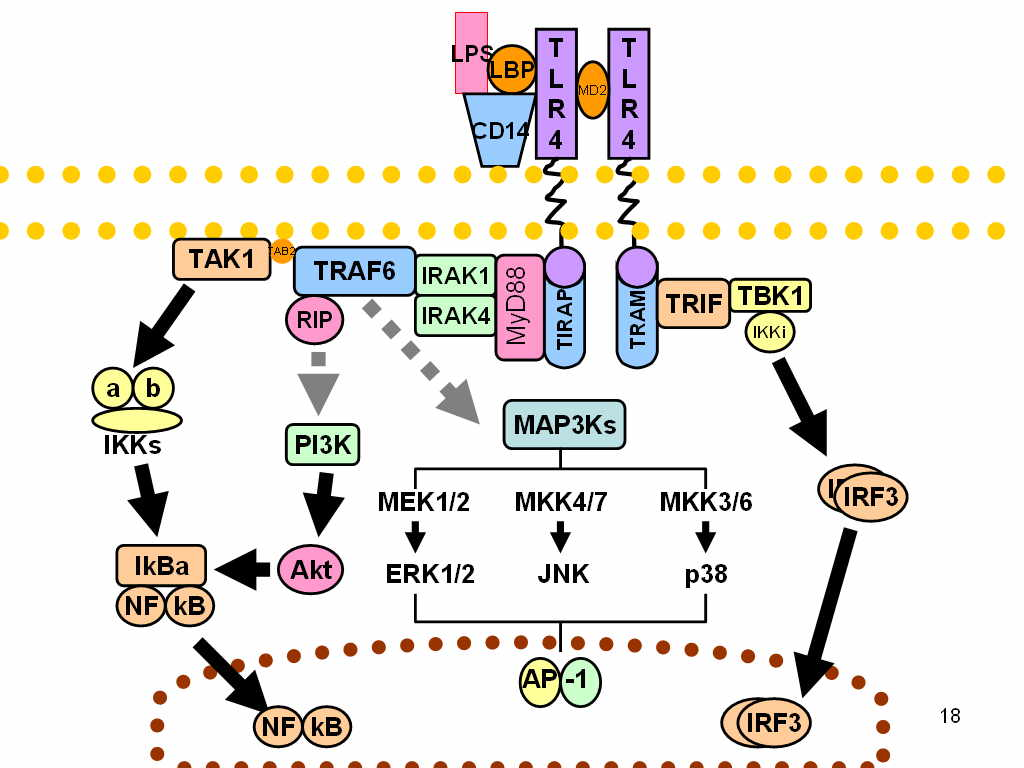
Signaling pathway of toll-like receptors. Dashed grey lines represent unknown associations

== See also ==
- MyD88
