= Toll/interleukin-1 receptor domain =

Intracellular signaling domain

TIR domain
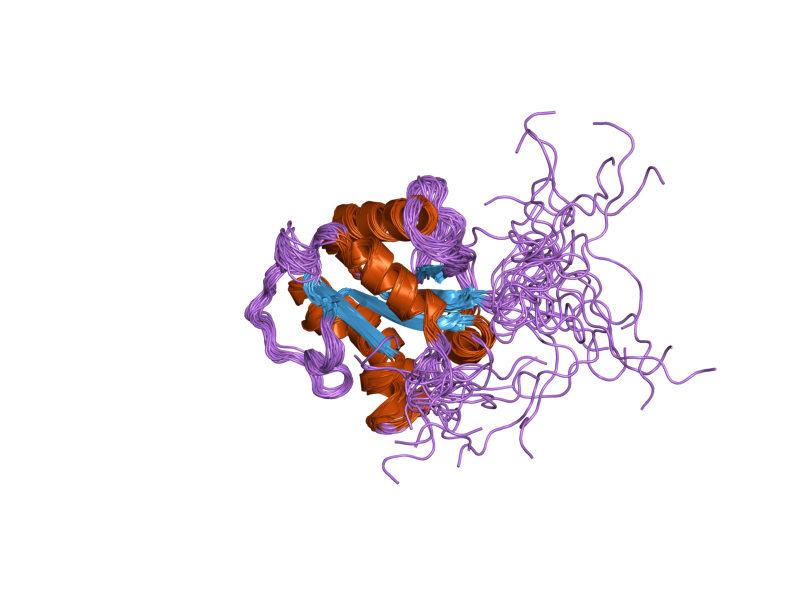
- Structure of the MyD88 TIR domain

Identifiers
- Symbol: TIR
- Pfam: PF01582
- InterPro: IPR000157
- SCOP2: 1fyv / SCOPe / SUPFAM
- OPM superfamily: 289
- OPM protein: 2mk9
- Membranome: 7
Available protein structures:
- PDB: IPR000157 PF01582 (ECOD; PDBsum)
- AlphaFold: IPR000157; PF01582

The Toll/Interleukin-1 receptor/Resistance protein (TIR) homology domain is an intracellular signaling domain found in MyD88, SARM1, interleukin-1 receptors, toll receptors and many plant R proteins. It contains three highly conserved regions, and mediates protein-protein interactions between the toll-like receptors (TLRs) and signal-transduction components. TIR-like motifs are also found in plant proteins where they are involved in resistance to disease and in bacteria where they are associated with virulence. When activated, TIR domains recruit cytoplasmic adaptor proteins MyD88 (UniProt Q99836) and TOLLIP (toll-interacting protein, UniProt Q9H0E2). In turn, these associate with various kinases to set off signaling cascades. Some TIR domains have also been found to have intrinsic NAD^{+} cleavage activity, such as in SARM1. In the case of SARM1, the TIR NADase activity leads to the production of Nam, ADPR and cADPR and the activation of downstream pathways involved in Wallerian degeneration and neuron death.

In Drosophila melanogaster the toll protein is involved in establishment of dorso-ventral polarity in the embryo. In addition, members of the toll family play a key role in innate antibacterial and antifungal immunity in insects as well as in mammals. These proteins are type-I transmembrane receptors that share an intracellular 200 residue domain with the interleukin-1 receptor (IL-1R), the toll/IL-1R homologous region (TIR). The similarity between toll-like receptors (TLRs) and IL-1R is not restricted to sequence homology since these proteins also share a similar signaling pathway. They both induce the activation of a Rel type transcription factor via an adaptor protein and a protein kinase. MyD88, a cytoplasmic adaptor protein found in mammals, contains a TIR domain associated to a DEATH domain. Besides the mammalian and Drosophila melanogaster proteins, a TIR domain is also found in a number of plant proteins implicated in host defense. As MyD88, these proteins are cytoplasmic.

Site directed mutagenesis and deletion analysis have shown that the TIR domain is essential for toll and IL-1R activities. Sequence analysis have revealed the presence of three highly conserved regions among the different members of the family: box 1 (FDAFISY), box 2 (GYKLC-RD-PG), and box 3 (a conserved W surrounded by basic residues). It has been proposed that boxes 1 and 2 are involved in the binding of proteins involved in signaling, whereas box 3 is primarily involved in directing localization of receptor, perhaps through interactions with cytoskeletal elements.

== Structure and Evolution ==
A structural phylogenetic tree of TIR-domain-containing proteins and structurally related proteins was inferred from experimentally determined protein structures and reported in 2019. The analysis suggested that TIR domains belong to a large enzyme superfamily.The tree was inferred by maximum likelihood using an evolutionary model of protein secondary-structure states, as described in "Protein structural phylogeny, a missing chapter in molecular evolutionary biology".

== Subfamilies ==
- Interleukin-1 receptor InterPro: IPR004075

== Human proteins containing this domain ==
IL18R1; IL18RAP; IL1R1; IL1RAP; IL1RAPL1; IL1RAPL2; IL1RL1; IL1RL2; MYD88; SIGIRR; TLR1; TLR10; TLR2; TLR3; TLR4; TLR5; TLR6; TLR7; TLR8; TLR9; SARM1;
