= Flagellin =

Bacterial protein

Identifiers
- Symbol: Flagellin
- Pfam: PF00700
- InterPro: IPR001492
- SCOP2: 1ucu / SCOPe / SUPFAM
Available protein structures:
- PDB: IPR001492 PF00700 (ECOD; PDBsum)
- AlphaFold: IPR001492; PF00700

Flagellins are a family of proteins present in flagellated bacteria which arrange themselves in a hollow cylinder to form the filament in a bacterial flagellum. Flagellin has a mass on average of about 40,000 daltons. Flagellins are the principal component of bacterial flagella that have a crucial role in bacterial motility.

The gene that encodes for flagellin has a different name in different bacterial species such as flaA (Helicobacter pylori for example), fliC, fljB.

== Structure ==
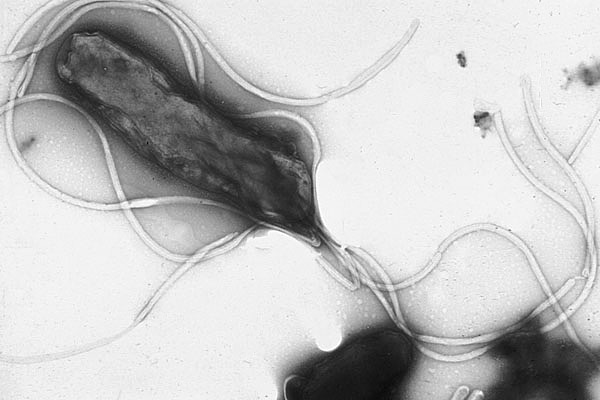
Helicobacter pylori electron micrograph, showing multiple flagella on the cell surface

The structure of flagellin is responsible for the helical shape of the flagellar filament, which is important for its proper function. It is transported through the center of the filament to the tip where it polymerases spontaneously into a part of the filament. In E. coli it is unfolded by the flagellar secretion chaperone FliS (P26608) during transport. The filament is made up of eleven smaller "protofilaments", nine of which contains flagellin in the L-type shape and the other two in the R-type shape.

The helical N- and C-termini of flagellin form the inner core of the flagellin protein, and is responsible for flagellin's ability to polymerize into a filament. The middle residues make up the outer surface of the flagellar filament. While the termini of the protein are quite similar among all bacterial flagellins, the middle portion is wildly variable and can be absent in some species. The flagellin domains are numbered from the helical core (D0/D1) to the outside (D2, ...); when viewed from the amino-acid sequence, D0/D1 appears on the two termini. Flagellin-like structural proteins are found in other portions of the flagellum, such as the hook (flgE; P75937), the rod at the base, and the cap at the top.

The middle part of E. coli (and related) flagellin, D3, displays a beta-folium fold and appears to maintain flagellar stability.

== Immune response ==
=== In mammals ===
Mammals often have acquired immune responses (T-cell and antibody responses) to flagellated bacterium, which occur frequently to flagellar antigens. Flagellin has also been shown to directly interact with TLR5 on T cells and TLR11. Some bacteria are able to switch between multiple flagellin genes in order to evade this response.

Flagellins contain a Toll-like receptor 5 (TLR5) epitope, a region recognized by the immune receptor TLR5. There are variations in the strength of flagellin binding and its ability to activate TLR5. Flagellins can be classified into three groups based on these characteristics: silent flagellins, evaders and stimulators. Silent flagellins bind to TLR5 but do not induce signaling. Evaders are incapable of binding and, consequently, do not trigger TLR5 activation. Stimulators exhibit variable binding capabilities to TLR5 yet possess the ability to activate TLR5.

The propensity of the immune response to flagellin may be explained by two facts:

- Flagellin is an extremely abundant protein in flagellated bacteria.
- There exists a specific innate immune receptor that recognizes flagellin, Toll-like receptor 5 (TLR5).

=== In plants ===
In addition, a 22-amino acid sequence (flg22) of the conserved N-terminal part of flagellin is known to activate plant defense mechanisms. Flagellin perception in Arabidopsis thaliana functions via the receptor-like-kinase FLS2 (FLAGELLIN SENSING 2). Upon flg22 detection, FLS2 quickly binds to BAK1 (BRI1-associated kinase 1) to initiate signaling by reciprocal transphosphorylation of their kinase domains. Both flagellin and UV-C act similarly to increase homologous recombination, as demonstrated by Molinier et al 2006. Beyond this somatic effect, they found this to extend to subsequent generations of the plant. Mitogen-activated-protein-kinases (MAPK) acts as downstream signaling compounds, leading ultimately to PAMP-triggered immunity in which more than 900 genes are up-/down-regulated upon flg22 treatment.

Pre-stimulation with a synthetic flg22-peptide led to enhanced resistance against bacterial invaders.
