= TICAM2 =

Protein-coding gene in the species Homo sapiens

Identifiers
- Aliases: TICAM2, MyD88-4, TICAM-2, TIRAP3, TIRP, TRAM, toll like receptor adaptor molecule 2, TIR domain containing adaptor molecule 2
- External IDs: OMIM: 608321; MGI: 3040056; GeneCards: TICAM2
Available structures
PDB	Ortholog search: PDBe RCSB
PDB	List of PDB id codes 2M1W

Gene location (Human)
Chr.	Chromosome 5 (human)
Band	5q22.3	Start	115,578,496 bp
Band	5q22.3	End	115,602,479 bp

Gene location (Mouse)
Chr.	Chromosome 18 (mouse)
Band	18|18 C	Start	46,690,358 bp
Band	18|18 C	End	46,707,600 bp
RNA expression pattern
Bgee	Human / Mouse (ortholog); Top expressed in: monocyte; testicle; granulocyte; Achilles tendon; endometrium; Descending thoracic aorta; right adrenal cortex; stromal cell of endometrium; spleen; lymph node / Top expressed in: ureter; granulocyte; epiblast; embryo; morula; tail of embryo; bone marrow; spleen; thymus; zygote; More reference expression data
BioGPS	n/a
Gene ontology
Molecular function	signal transducer activity; protein binding
Cellular component	cytoplasm; endosome; late endosome; Golgi apparatus; early endosome membrane; membrane; late endosome membrane; plasma membrane; early endosome; endoplasmic reticulum; endosome membrane; secretory granule membrane
Biological process	toll-like receptor 4 signaling pathway; negative regulation of chemokine (C-C motif) ligand 5 production; immune system process; TRAM-dependent toll-like receptor 4 signaling pathway; TRIF-dependent toll-like receptor signaling pathway; positive regulation of toll-like receptor 4 signaling pathway; positive regulation of I-kappaB kinase/NF-kappaB signaling; inflammatory response; cellular response to lipopolysaccharide; I-kappaB kinase/NF-kappaB signaling; negative regulation of toll-like receptor 4 signaling pathway; MyD88-independent toll-like receptor signaling pathway; signal transduction; necroptosis; apoptotic signaling pathway; negative regulation of MyD88-independent toll-like receptor signaling pathway; innate immune response; neutrophil degranulation; positive regulation of chemokine (C-C motif) ligand 5 production; positive regulation of interleukin-18-mediated signaling pathway
Sources:Amigo / QuickGO
Orthologs
Databases	NCBI: entry; OMA: entry
Species	Human	Mouse
Entrez	353376	225471
Ensembl	ENSG00000243414	ENSMUSG00000056130
UniProt	Q86XR7	Q8BJQ4
RefSeq (mRNA)	NM_021649	NM_173394
RefSeq (protein)	NP_067681; NP_001157940; NP_001157941	NP_775570
Location (UCSC)	Chr 5: 115.58 – 115.6 Mb	Chr 18: 46.69 – 46.71 Mb
PubMed search
- Wikidata
View/Edit Human	View/Edit Mouse

TIR domain-containing adapter molecule 2 is a protein that in humans is encoded by the TICAM2 gene. Historically, it was often called TRIF-related adaptor molecule (TRAM).

TICAM2 is a Toll/interleukin-1 receptor domain-containing adaptor protein involved in Toll receptor signaling.
