= Spätzle (protein) =

Protein found in Drosophila melanogaster

Identifiers
- Organism: Drosophila melanogaster
- Symbol: spz
- UniProt: P48607
Search for
- Structures: Swiss-model
- Domains: InterPro

Spätzle

Identifiers
- Symbol: Spaetzle
- Pfam: PF16077
- InterPro: IPR032104
Available protein structures:
- Pfam: structures / ECOD
- PDB: RCSB PDB; PDBe; PDBj
- PDBsum: structure summary

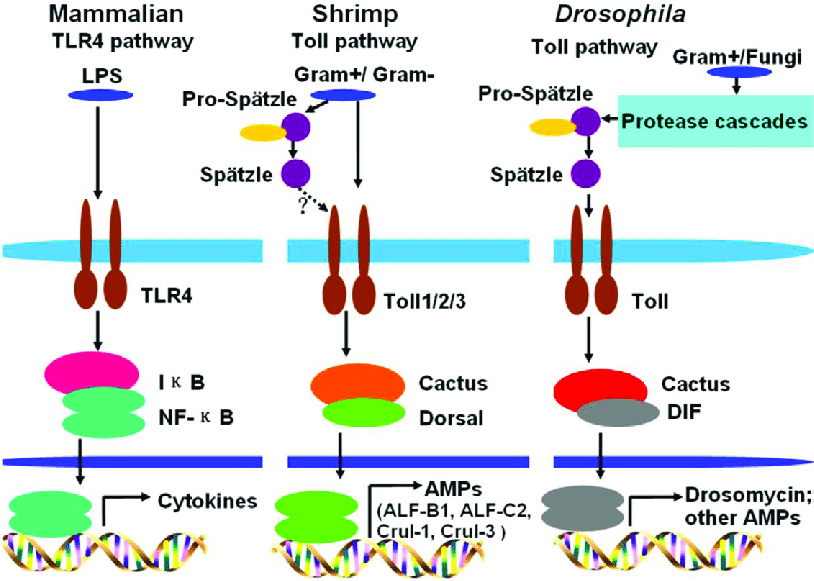
Toll signaling pathways in mammals, shrimp and fruit flies

Spätzle or spaetzle (German for a type of noodle) is an evolutionarily-conserved arthropod protein first identified in Drosophila melanogaster. It plays a role in embryonic development and in the insect innate immune response. The name was coined by the Nobel laureate Christiane Nüsslein-Volhard after the Spätzle noodle-like form of homozygous mutant fly larvae.

== Structure ==
Spätzle has a cystine knot structure supported by disulfide bridges, is glycosylated, and naturally forms a homodimer. Multiple forms are produced by alternative splicing. It is produced as a preprotein, and needs to be activated by a serine protease called spätzle-processing enzyme. The signal sequence spz[1-25] is first cleaved, followed by the spz[26-220] fragment, leaving the final spz[221-326] (Spaetzle C-106) part as the mature protein.

== Function ==
Homodimeric spz binds to a dimeric toll receptor in fruit flies and related organisms, thus activating the signaling cascade.

=== Embryonic development ===
A ligand of the toll pathway, spz is involved in the formation of the dorso-ventral axis in embryonic development.
