= TICAM1 =

Protein found in humans

Identifiers
- Aliases: TICAM1, IIAE6, MyD88-3, PRVTIRB, TICAM-1, TRIF, toll like receptor adaptor molecule 1, TIR domain containing adaptor molecule 1
- External IDs: OMIM: 607601; MGI: 2147032; GeneCards: TICAM1
Available structures
PDB	Ortholog search: PDBe RCSB
PDB	List of PDB id codes 2M1X, 2M63, 3RC4, 4BSX, 4C0M, 5JEL

Gene location (Human)
Chr.	Chromosome 19 (human)
Band	19p13.3	Start	4,815,932 bp
Band	19p13.3	End	4,831,712 bp

Gene location (Mouse)
Chr.	Chromosome 17 (mouse)
Band	17|17 D	Start	56,576,319 bp
Band	17|17 D	End	56,583,786 bp
RNA expression pattern
Bgee	Human / Mouse (ortholog); Top expressed in: buccal mucosa cell; granulocyte; mucosa of transverse colon; parotid gland; gastrocnemius muscle; ascending aorta; skin of abdomen; muscle of thigh; body of stomach; right lobe of liver / Top expressed in: granulocyte; jejunum; ileum; duodenum; lacrimal gland; epithelium of stomach; urethra; female urethra; yolk sac; colon; More reference expression data
BioGPS	n/a
Gene ontology
Molecular function	signal transducer activity; protein binding; protein kinase binding
Cellular component	cytosol; ripoptosome; autophagosome; endosome membrane; cytoplasmic vesicle
Biological process	response to exogenous dsRNA; immune system process; positive regulation of nitric oxide biosynthetic process; positive regulation of natural killer cell activation; macrophage activation involved in immune response; response to lipopolysaccharide; positive regulation of B cell proliferation; positive regulation of NF-kappaB transcription factor activity; defense response to virus; positive regulation of interleukin-6 production; positive regulation of tumor necrosis factor production; positive regulation of I-kappaB kinase/NF-kappaB signaling; positive regulation of B cell activation; positive regulation of protein binding; inflammatory response; I-kappaB kinase/NF-kappaB signaling; positive regulation of protein ubiquitination; regulation of protein homodimerization activity; positive regulation of type I interferon production; MyD88-independent toll-like receptor signaling pathway; lipopolysaccharide-mediated signaling pathway; signal transduction; necroptosis; apoptotic signaling pathway; apoptotic process; negative regulation of MyD88-independent toll-like receptor signaling pathway; innate immune response; positive regulation of autophagy; TRIF-dependent toll-like receptor signaling pathway; cellular response to lipopolysaccharide
Sources:Amigo / QuickGO
Orthologs
Databases	NCBI: entry; OMA: entry
Species	Human	Mouse
Entrez	148022	106759
Ensembl	ENSG00000127666	ENSMUSG00000047123
UniProt	Q8IUC6	Q80UF7
RefSeq (mRNA)	NM_182919; NM_014261; NM_001385678; NM_001385679; NM_001385680	NM_174989
RefSeq (protein)	NP_891549	NP_778154
Location (UCSC)	Chr 19: 4.82 – 4.83 Mb	Chr 17: 56.58 – 56.58 Mb
PubMed search
- Wikidata
View/Edit Human	View/Edit Mouse

TIR domain containing adaptor molecule 1 (TICAM1; formerly known as TIR-domain-containing adapter-inducing interferon-β or TRIF) is an adapter in responding to activation of toll-like receptors (TLRs). It mediates the rather delayed cascade of two TLR-associated signaling cascades, where the other one is dependent upon a MyD88 adapter.

Toll-like receptors (TLRs) recognize specific components of microbial invaders and activate an immune response to these pathogens. After these receptors recognize highly conserved pathogenic patterns, a downstream signaling cascade is activated in order to stimulate the release of inflammatory cytokines and chemokines as well as to upregulate the expression of immune cells. All TLRs have a TIR domain that initiates the signaling cascade through TIR adapters. Adapters are platforms that organize downstream signaling cascades leading to a specific cellular response after exposure to a given pathogen.

== Structure ==
TICAM1 is primarily active in the spleen and is often regulated when MyD88 is deficient in the liver, indicating organ-specific regulation of signaling pathways. Curiously, there is a lack of redundancy within the TLR4 signaling pathway that leads to microbial evasion of immune response in the host after mutations occur within intermediates of the pathway. Three TRAF-binding motifs present in the amino terminal region of TICAM1 are necessary for association with TRAF6. Destruction of these motifs reduced the activation of NF-κB, a transcription factor that is also activated by the carboxy-terminal domain of TICAM1 in the upregulation of cytokines and co-stimulatory immune molecules. This domain recruits receptor-interacting protein (RIP1) and RIP3 through the RIP homotypic interaction motif. Cells deficient for RIP1 gene display attenuated TLR3 activation of NF-κB, indicating the use of the RIP1 gene in downstream TICAM1 activation, in contrast to other TLRs that use IRAK protein for the activation of NF-κB.

== Areas of research ==
Investigations into the function of TICAM1 are of great significance to various fields of biomedical research. The pathogenesis of infectious disease, septic shock, tumor growth, and rheumatoid arthritis all have close ties with TLR signaling pathways, specifically to that of TICAM1 . Better understanding of the TICAM1 pathway will be therapeutically useful in the development of vaccines and treatments that can control associated inflammation and antiviral responses. Experiments involving wild-type and TICAM1-deficient mice are critical for understanding the coordinated responses of TLR pathways. It is necessary to study the coordinated effects of these pathways in order to understand the complex responses initiated by TICAM1.
