= Toll-like receptor 5 =

Protein found in humans

TLR5
Available structures
PDB	Ortholog search: PDBe RCSB
PDB	List of PDB id codes 3J0A

Identifiers
- Aliases: TLR5, MELIOS, SLE1, SLEB1, TIL3, toll like receptor 5
- External IDs: OMIM: 603031; MGI: 1858171; HomoloGene: 20698; GeneCards: TLR5; OMA:TLR5 - orthologs

Gene location (Human)
Chr.	Chromosome 1 (human)
Band	1q41	Start	223,109,404 bp
Band	1q41	End	223,143,248 bp

Gene location (Mouse)
Chr.	Chromosome 1 (mouse)
Band	1 H5|1 86.12 cM	Start	182,782,353 bp
Band	1 H5|1 86.12 cM	End	182,804,010 bp
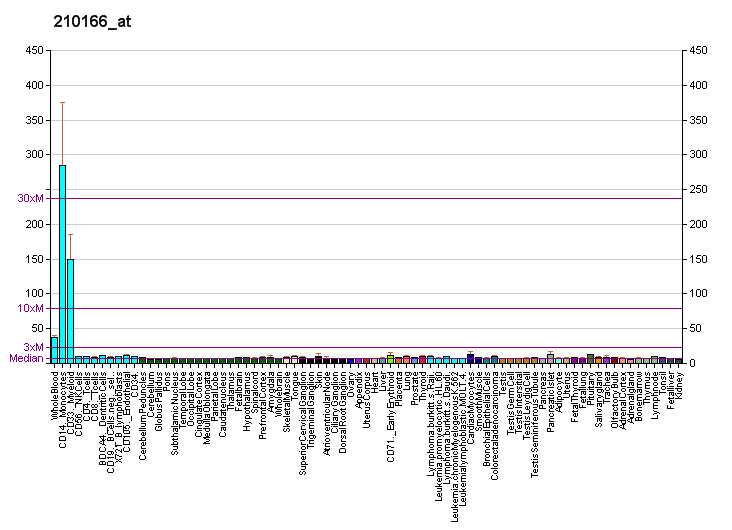
RNA expression pattern
Bgee	Human / Mouse (ortholog); Top expressed in: monocyte; blood; epithelium of bronchus; left ovary; bronchial epithelial cell; right ovary; epithelium of lactiferous gland; lactiferous duct; lower lobe of lung; mucosa of paranasal sinus / Top expressed in: granulocyte; embryo; embryo; placenta; secondary oocyte; liver; primary oocyte; zygote; lip; muscle of thigh; More reference expression data
BioGPS	More reference expression data
Gene ontology
Molecular function	transmembrane signaling receptor activity; interleukin-1 receptor binding
Cellular component	integral component of membrane; membrane; plasma membrane
Biological process	positive regulation of cytokine production; signal transduction; positive regulation of toll-like receptor signaling pathway; defense response to bacterium; MyD88-dependent toll-like receptor signaling pathway; toll-like receptor 5 signaling pathway; immune system process; positive regulation of interleukin-8 production; cellular response to mechanical stimulus; innate immune response; inflammatory response
Sources:Amigo / QuickGO
Orthologs
Species	Human	Mouse
Entrez	7100	53791
Ensembl	ENSG00000187554	ENSMUSG00000079164
UniProt	O60602	Q9JLF7
RefSeq (mRNA)	NM_003268	NM_016928
RefSeq (protein)	NP_003259	NP_058624
Location (UCSC)	Chr 1: 223.11 – 223.14 Mb	Chr 1: 182.78 – 182.8 Mb
PubMed search
- Wikidata
View/Edit Human	View/Edit Mouse

Toll-like receptor 5, also known as TLR5, is a protein which in humans is encoded by the TLR5 gene. It is a member of the toll-like receptor (TLR) family. TLR5 is known to recognize bacterial flagellin from invading mobile bacteria. It has been shown to be involved in the onset of many diseases, including Inflammatory bowel disease due to the high expression of TLR in intestinal lamina propria dendritic cells. Recent studies have also shown that malfunctioning of TLR5 is likely related to rheumatoid arthritis, osteoclastogenesis, and bone loss. Abnormal TLR5 functioning is related to the onset of gastric, cervical, endometrial and ovarian cancers.

== Function ==
The TLR family plays a fundamental role in pathogen recognition and activation of innate immunity. TLRs are highly conserved from Drosophila to humans and share structural and functional similarities. They recognize pathogen-associated molecular patterns (PAMPs) that are expressed on infectious agents, and mediate the production of cytokines necessary for the development of effective immunity. The various TLRs exhibit different patterns of expression. TLR5 is expressed on both immune and non-immune cells. TLR5 recognizes bacterial flagellin, a principal component of bacterial flagella and a virulence factor. The activation of this receptor mobilizes the nuclear factor NF-κB and stimulates tumor necrosis factor-alpha production.

TLR5 recognizes bacterial flagellin, the protein monomer of bacterial flagella and a virulence factor. Flagellin are found on nearly all motile bacteria and contains regions that are highly conserved among all bacteria, facilitating the recognition of flagellin by a germ-line encoded receptor such as TLR5. The activation of this receptor mobilizes the nuclear factor NF-κB and stimulates tumor necrosis factor-alpha production. However, some Proteobacteria flagella have acquired mutations preventing their recognition by TLR5.

== Signaling pathway and regulation ==
The TLR5 signaling cascade is commonly triggered by the binding of bacterial flagellum to TLR5 on the cell surface. Binding of flagellum induces the dimerization of TLR5, which in turn recruits MyD88 and Mal/TIRAP. The recruitment of MyD88 leads to subsequent activation of IRAK4, IRAK1, TRAF6, and eventually IκB kinases. Activation of IκB kinases contributes to the nuclear localization of NF-κB (a proinflammatory cytokine). NF-κB induces many downstream gene expressions, which initiates the canonical proinflammatory pathway. This TLR5/flagellum interaction results in different responses in difference cell types. In epithelial cells, binding of flagellum to TLR5 induces IL8 production. In human monocytes and dendritic cells, this interaction results in the secretion of proinflammatory cytokines such as TNF.

Recent study has identified Caveolin-1 as a potential regulator of TLR5 expression. In contrast to the decreased TLR4 level in senescent cells, TLR5 expression maintains relatively stable during the aging process, which is correlated with the high level of Caveolin-1 in aging cells. Data from Caveolin-1 knockout mice demonstrated that TLR5 expression significantly decreases in the absence of Caveolin-1 expression in aging cells. It is hypothesized that the Caveolin-1 directly interacts with TLR5 to stabilize it and hence increases the level of TLR5.

== Clinical significance ==
=== Inflammatory bowel disease ===
TLR5 may play a role in inflammatory bowel disease (IBD), since TLR5 expression on intestinal epithelial cells (IEC's) are important for maintaining the composition of intestinal microbiota. Additionally, TLR5-deficient mice develop spontaneous colitis and metabolic syndrome which are associated with altered gut microbiota. Statistically significant lower levels of TLR5 expression have been found in patients exhibiting moderate to severe ulcerative colitis (UC). In these patients, lower TLR5 mRNA levels were found along with decreased immunoreactivity of TLR5 in the inflamed mucosa of UC patients.

=== Osteoclastogenesis and bone loss ===
Bone loss and osteoclastogenesis are induced by inflammation in infectious and autoimmune diseases. A recent study has identified TLR5 as a novel mediator in the process of inflammation-induced bone loss and osteoclastogenesis. Flagellin, which is a TLR5-activating ligand, is present in synovial fluid from patients with rheumatoid arthritis. Activation of TLR5 in these patients leads to subsequent activation of receptor activator of NF-κB ligand (RANKL). Activation of RANKL leads to increased expression of osteoclastic genes. Activation of these genes results in robust osteoclast formation and bone loss. This process is absent in TLR5 knockout mice model.

=== Cancer ===
==== Gastric ====
Chronic inflammation in GI tract has been known to increase the risk of gastric cancer, with H. pylori being one of the most common resources of infection. TLR5 is an essential factor in inducing inflammatory response to H. pylori infection. During infection, expression and ligation of TLR5 and TLR2 are required for the activation of proinflammatory cytokines such as NF-κB. However, TLR5 interaction with H. pylori only induces weak TLR5 activation. The inflammatory response induced by TLR5 during H. pylori is also considered to be possibly flagellin independent. This suggests that an unknown H. pylori factor is responsible for this response In addition to inflammation induction, TLR5 is also shown to enhance gastric cancer cell proliferation through an ERK-dependent pathway. This is supported by the increased level of TLR5 expression from normal gastric mucosa to gastric cancer cells.

==== Cervical ====
TLR5 is suggested to be possibly involved in HPV induced inflammation and subsequent cervical neoplasia formation. TLR5 is generally absent in normal cervical squamous epithelium. However, a gradually increased level of TLR5 expression has been detected in low-grade cervical intraepithelial neoplasia (CIN), high grade CIN, and invasive cervical cancer. However, the exact mechanism of interaction between TLR5 and HPV is not known.

==== Ovarian ====
It has been reported that TLR5 expression is detected in both ovarian epithelium and ovarian cancer cell lines but not in ovarian stroma, suggesting a possible role of TLR5 in inflammation induced ovarian cancer onset.
