= IRAK2 =

Protein-coding gene in humans

Identifiers
- Aliases: IRAK2, IRAK-2, interleukin 1 receptor associated kinase 2
- External IDs: OMIM: 603304; MGI: 2429603; GeneCards: IRAK2
Available structures
PDB	Ortholog search: PDBe RCSB
PDB	List of PDB id codes 3MOP

Gene location (Human)
Chr.	Chromosome 3 (human)
Band	3p25.3	Start	10,164,919 bp
Band	3p25.3	End	10,243,745 bp

Gene location (Mouse)
Chr.	Chromosome 6 (mouse)
Band	6 E3|6 52.82 cM	Start	113,615,428 bp
Band	6 E3|6 52.82 cM	End	113,671,987 bp
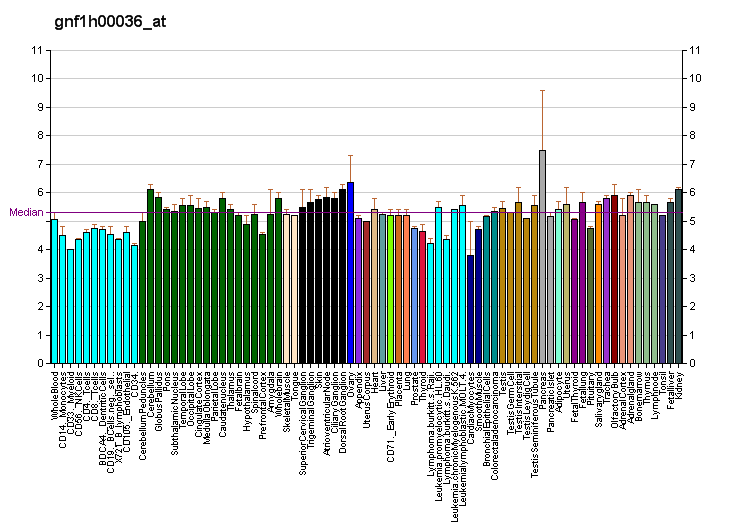
RNA expression pattern
Bgee	Human / Mouse (ortholog); Top expressed in: cartilage tissue; pancreatic epithelial cell; secondary oocyte; pancreatic ductal cell; palpebral conjunctiva; gastrocnemius muscle; tibialis anterior muscle; amniotic fluid; endothelial cell; islet of Langerhans / Top expressed in: granulocyte; jejunum; urinary bladder; white adipose tissue; spleen; left lung; colon; proximal tubule; duodenum; ileum; More reference expression data
BioGPS	More reference expression data
Gene ontology
Molecular function	nucleotide binding; protein kinase activity; protein homodimerization activity; protein serine/threonine kinase activity; protein binding; protein heterodimerization activity; ATP binding
Cellular component	cytoplasm; cytosol; plasma membrane; endosome membrane; nucleus
Biological process	response to interleukin-1; negative regulation of DNA-binding transcription factor activity; toll-like receptor signaling pathway; protein phosphorylation; JNK cascade; positive regulation of NF-kappaB transcription factor activity; toll-like receptor 9 signaling pathway; negative regulation of NF-kappaB transcription factor activity; nucleotide-binding oligomerization domain containing signaling pathway; lipopolysaccharide-mediated signaling pathway; signal transduction; regulation of cytokine-mediated signaling pathway; I-kappaB kinase/NF-kappaB signaling; inflammatory response; MyD88-dependent toll-like receptor signaling pathway; intracellular signal transduction; interleukin-1-mediated signaling pathway; cytokine-mediated signaling pathway
Sources:Amigo / QuickGO
Orthologs
Databases	NCBI: entry; OMA: entry
Species	Human	Mouse
Entrez	3656	108960
Ensembl	ENSG00000134070	ENSMUSG00000060477
UniProt	O43187	Q8CFA1
RefSeq (mRNA)	NM_001570	NM_001113553; NM_172161
RefSeq (protein)	NP_001561	NP_001107025; NP_751893
Location (UCSC)	Chr 3: 10.16 – 10.24 Mb	Chr 6: 113.62 – 113.67 Mb
PubMed search
- Wikidata
View/Edit Human	View/Edit Mouse

Interleukin-1 receptor-associated kinase-like 2 is an enzyme that in humans is encoded by the IRAK2 gene.

== Function ==
IRAK2 encodes the interleukin-1 receptor-associated kinase 2, one of two putative serine/threonine kinases that become associated with the interleukin-1 receptor (IL1R) upon stimulation. IRAK2 is reported to participate in the IL1-induced upregulation of NF-kappaB.

== Interactions ==
IRAK2 has been shown to interact with TRAF6 and Myd88.
