= Profilin =

Actin-binding protein

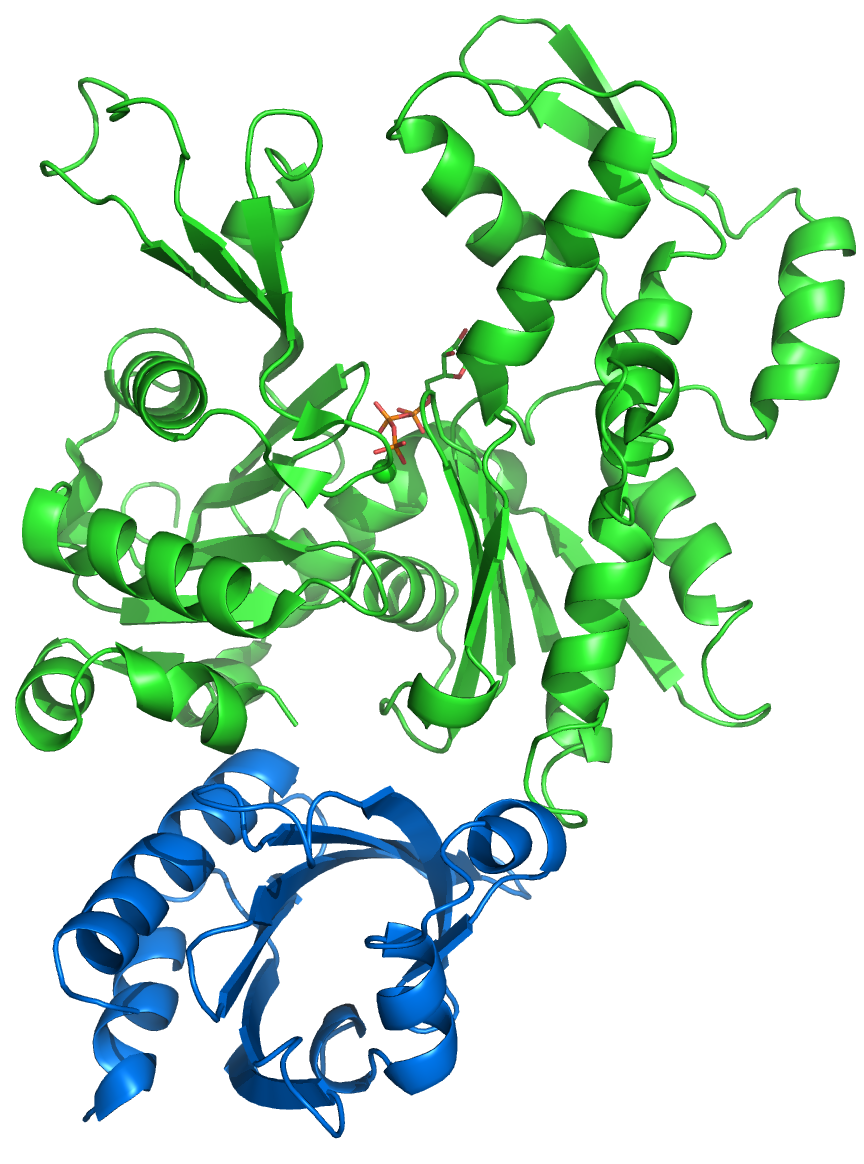
- Profilin (blue) in complex with actin (green). (PDB code: 2BTF)

Identifiers
- Symbol: Profilin
- Pfam: PF00235
- InterPro: IPR002097
- SMART: PROF
- PROSITE: PS00414
- SCOP2: 2btf / SCOPe / SUPFAM
- CDD: cd00148
Available protein structures:
- PDB: 2btf IPR002097 PF00235 (ECOD; PDBsum)
- AlphaFold: IPR002097; PF00235

Profilin is an actin-binding protein involved in the dynamic turnover and reconstruction of the actin cytoskeleton. It is found in most eukaryotic organisms. Profilin is important for spatially and temporally controlled growth of actin microfilaments, which is an essential process in cellular locomotion and cell shape changes. This restructuring of the actin cytoskeleton is essential for processes such as organ development, wound healing, and the hunting down of infectious intruders by cells of the immune system.

Profilin also binds sequences rich in the amino acid proline in diverse proteins. While most profilin in the cell is bound to actin, profilins have over 50 different binding partners. Many of those are related to actin regulation, but profilin also seems to be involved in activities in the nucleus such as mRNA splicing.

Profilin is the major allergen (via IgE) present in birch, grass, and other pollen.

== Sources and distribution ==
Profilins are proteins of molecular weights of roughly 14–19 kDa. They are present as single genes in yeast, insects, and worms, and as multiple genes in many other organisms including plants. In mammalian cells, four profilin isoforms have been discovered; profilin-I is expressed in most tissues while profilin-II is predominant in brain and kidney.

Asgard archaea use profilins. Multiple eukaryotic diatom species lack profilins.

Profilin is essential to host cell invasion by Toxoplasma gondii. Toxoplasma profilin is the specific pathogen-associated molecular pattern (PAMP) of TLRs 5, 11, and 12.

== Regulation of actin dynamics ==
Profilin enhances actin growth in two ways:

- Profilin binds to monomeric actin thereby occupying an actin-actin contact site; in effect, profilin sequesters actin from the pool of polymerizable actin monomers. However, profilin also catalyzes the exchange of actin-bound ADP to ATP thereby converting poorly polymerizing ADP-actin monomers into readily polymerizing ATP-actin monomers. On top of that, profilin has a higher affinity for ATP- than for ADP-actin monomers. Thus in a mixture of actin, profilin, and nucleotides (ADP and ATP), actin will polymerize to a certain extent, which may be estimated by the law of mass action.
- Profilin-actin complexes are fed into growing actin polymers by proteins such as formin, Wiskott-Aldrich syndrome protein and Vasodilator-stimulated phosphoprotein which contain proline-rich FH1-domains. This mode of stimulated actin polymerization is much faster than unaided polymerization. Profilin is essential for this mode of polymerization because it recruits the actin monomers to the proline-rich proteins.

Profilin binds some variants of membrane phospholipids (phosphatidylinositol (4,5)-bisphosphate and inositol trisphosphate). The function of this interaction is the sequestration of profilin in an "inactive" form, from where it can be released by action of the enzyme phospholipase C.

Profilin negatively regulates PI(3,4)P_{2} limiting recruitment of lamellipodia to the leading edge of the cell.

Profilin is one of the most abundant actin monomer binders, but proteins such as CAP and (in mammals) thymosin β4 have some functional overlaps with profilin. In contrast, ADF/cofilin has some properties that antagonize profilin action.

== History of discovery ==
Profilin was first described by Lars Carlsson in the lab of Uno Lindberg and co-workers in the early 1970s as the first actin monomer binding protein. It followed the realization that not only muscle, but also non-muscle cells, contained high concentrations of actin, albeit in part in an unpolymerized form. Profilin was then believed to sequester actin monomers (keep them in a pro-filamentous form), and release them upon a signal to make them accessible for fast actin polymer growth.

== Allergen ==
Profilin allergy is significantly associated with respiratory allergy to grass pollen (hay fever). After a person first becomes allergic to profilin through inhalation of grass or tree pollen, allergy to profilin-containing food and development of pollen-food syndrome occurs How often pollen-allergic people across Europe become profilin allergic varies widely; As of 1997, from about 5% of Swedish birch pollen–allergic people to 51% in Spanish people allergic to Mercurialis annua were profilin allergic. Profilin is the major allergen of certain food plants, for example, melon, orange, and soybean and thus allergy to melon, citrus fruits, tomato, and banana is a clinical marker of profilin hypersensitivity. As of 2018 there was no "solid therapeutic approach" to treat profilin allergy.

As of 2018, the list of members of the profilin family identified as allergens contained:

- Actinidia chinensis var. deliciosa (kiwifruit)
- Ambrosia artemisiifolia (short ragweed)
- Ananas comosus (pineapple)
- Apium graveolens (celery)
- Arachis hypogaea (peanut)
- Artemisia vulgaris (mugwort)
- Betula verrucosa (European white birch) and Betula pendula (silver birch)
- Capsicum annuum (bell pepper)
- Chenopodium album (pigweed)
- Citrus sinensis (sweet orange)
- Corylus avellana (hazel)
- Cucumis melo (muskmelon)
- Daucus carota (carrot)
- Glycine max (soybean)
- Helianthus annuus (sunflower)
- Hevea brasiliensis (para rubber tree [latex])
- Malus domestica (apple)
- Olea europaea (olive)
- Phleum pratense (timothy grass)
- Phoenix dactylifera (date palm)
- Prunus persica (peach)
- Pyrus communis (pear)
- Salsola kali (Russian thistle)
- Sinapis alba (yellow mustard)
- Solanum lycopersicum (tomato)

== Human genes ==
- PFN1, PFN2, PFN3, PFN4, PFN5
