= MYD88 =

Protein found in humans

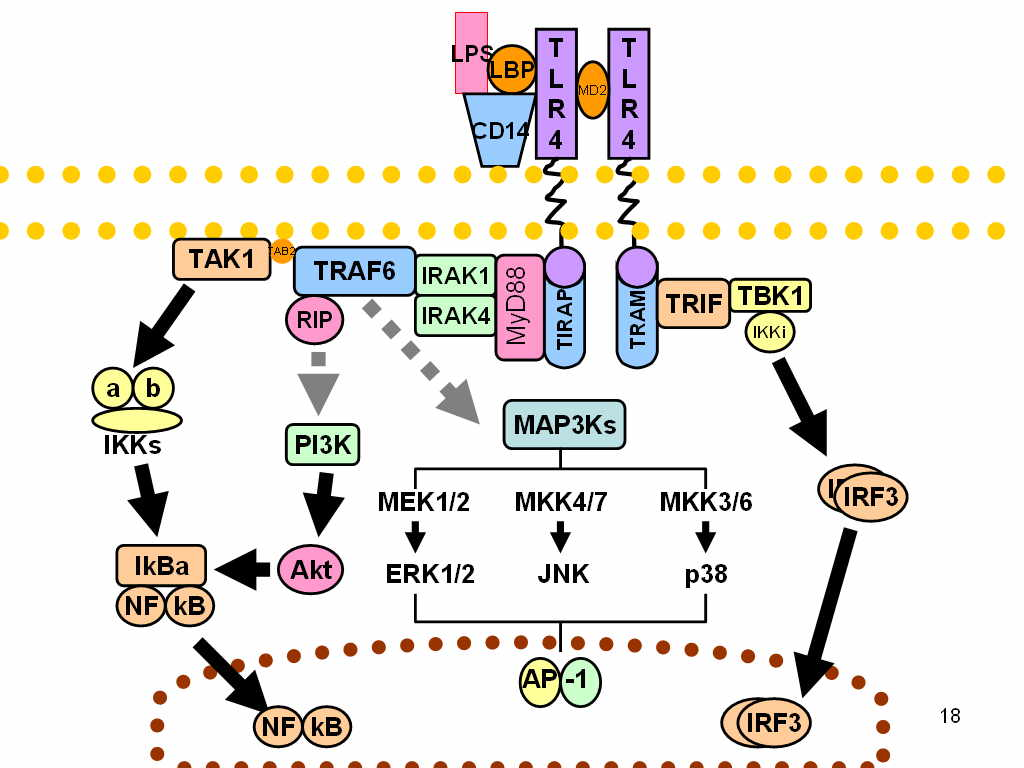

Identifiers
- Aliases: MYD88, MYD88D, myeloid differentiation primary response 88, innate immune signal transduction adaptor, MYD88 innate immune signal transduction adaptor, IMD68
- External IDs: OMIM: 602170; MGI: 108005; GeneCards: MYD88
Available structures
PDB	Ortholog search: PDBe RCSB
PDB	List of PDB id codes 2JS7, 2Z5V, 3MOP, 4DOM, 4EO7

Gene location (Human)
Chr.	Chromosome 3 (human)
Band	3p22.2	Start	38,138,478 bp
Band	3p22.2	End	38,143,022 bp

Gene location (Mouse)
Chr.	Chromosome 9 (mouse)
Band	9 F3|9 71.33 cM	Start	119,165,000 bp
Band	9 F3|9 71.33 cM	End	119,170,477 bp
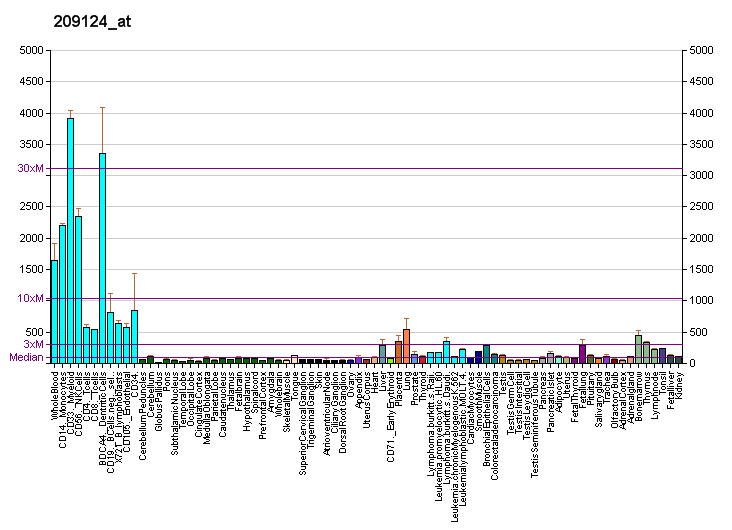
RNA expression pattern
Bgee	Human / Mouse (ortholog); Top expressed in: white blood cell; mononuclear cell; monocyte; granulocyte; blood; gingival epithelium; mucosa of ileum; periodontal fiber; nasal epithelium; palpebral conjunctiva / Top expressed in: granulocyte; stroma of bone marrow; right lung lobe; lip; ankle joint; uterus; esophagus; tibiofemoral joint; blood; duodenum; More reference expression data
BioGPS	More reference expression data
Gene ontology
Molecular function	death receptor binding; protein binding; TIR domain binding; identical protein binding; protein self-association; Toll-like receptor binding
Cellular component	cytosol; plasma membrane; endosome membrane; cytoplasm; nucleus
Biological process	response to interleukin-1; immune system process; negative regulation of apoptotic process; MyD88-dependent toll-like receptor signaling pathway; toll-like receptor signaling pathway; cell surface receptor signaling pathway; cellular response to mechanical stimulus; regulation of inflammatory response; positive regulation of interleukin-6 production; positive regulation of I-kappaB kinase/NF-kappaB signaling; toll-like receptor 9 signaling pathway; positive regulation of interleukin-17 production; inflammatory response; 3'-UTR-mediated mRNA stabilization; positive regulation of type I interferon production; positive regulation of interleukin-23 production; signal transduction; defense response to Gram-positive bacterium; positive regulation of NF-kappaB transcription factor activity; apoptotic process; innate immune response; type I interferon signaling pathway; positive regulation of gene expression; positive regulation of interleukin-8 production; defense response to bacterium; interleukin-1-mediated signaling pathway; cellular response to oxidised low-density lipoprotein particle stimulus; positive regulation of cytokine production involved in inflammatory response; phagocytosis; Toll signaling pathway
Sources:Amigo / QuickGO
Orthologs
Databases	NCBI: entry; OMA: entry
Species	Human	Mouse
Entrez	4615	17874
Ensembl	ENSG00000172936	ENSMUSG00000032508
UniProt	Q99836	P22366
RefSeq (mRNA)	NM_001172566; NM_001172567; NM_001172568; NM_001172569; NM_002468 NM_001365876; NM_001365877; NM_001374787; NM_001374788	NM_010851
RefSeq (protein)	NP_001166037; NP_001166038; NP_001166039; NP_001166040; NP_002459 NP_001352805; NP_001352806; NP_001361716; NP_001361717	NP_034981
Location (UCSC)	Chr 3: 38.14 – 38.14 Mb	Chr 9: 119.17 – 119.17 Mb
PubMed search
- Wikidata
View/Edit Human	View/Edit Mouse

Myeloid differentiation primary response 88 (MYD88) is a protein that, in humans, is encoded by the MYD88 gene. originally discovered in the laboratory of Dan A. Liebermann (Lord et al. Oncogene 1990) as a Myeloid differentiation primary response gene.

== Function ==
The MYD88 gene provides instructions for making a protein involved in signaling within immune cells. The MyD88 protein acts as an adapter, connecting proteins that receive signals from outside the cell to the proteins that relay signals inside the cell.

In innate immunity, the MyD88 plays a pivotal role in immune cell activation through Toll-like receptors (TLRs), which belong to large group of pattern recognition receptors (PRR). In general, these receptors sense common patterns which are shared by various pathogens – Pathogen-associated molecular pattern (PAMPs), or which are produced/released during cellular damage – damage-associated molecular patterns (DAMPs).

TLRs are homologous to Toll receptors, which were first described in the ontogenesis of fruit flies Drosophila, being responsible for dorso-ventral development. Hence, TLRs have been proved in all animals from insects to mammals. TLRs are located either on the cellular surface (TLR1, TLR2, TLR4, TLR5, TLR6) or within endosomes (TLR3, TLR7, TLR8, TLR9) sensing extracellular or phagocytosed pathogens, respectively. TLRs are integral membrane glycoproteins with typical semicircular-shaped extracellular parts containing leucine-rich repeats responsible for ligand binding, and Intracellular parts containing Toll-Interleukin receptor (TIR) domain.

After ligand binding, all TLRs, apart from TLR3, interact with adaptor protein MyD88. Another adaptor protein, which is activated by TLR3 and TLR4, is called TIR domain-containing adapter-inducing IFN-β (TRIF). Subsequently, these proteins activate two important transcription factors:

- NF-κB is a dimeric protein responsible for expression of various inflammatory cytokines, chemokines and adhesion and costimulatory molecules, which in turn triggers acute inflammation and stimulation of adaptive immunity
- IRFs is a group of proteins responsible for expression of type I interferons setting the so-called antiviral state of a cell.

TLR7 and TLR9 activate both NF-κB and IRF3 through MyD88-dependent and TRIF-independent pathway, respectively.

The human ortholog MYD88 seems to function similarly to mice, since the immunological phenotype of human cells deficient in MYD88 is similar to cells from MyD88 deficient mice. However, available evidence suggests that MYD88 is dispensable for human resistance to common viral infections and to all but a few pyogenic bacterial infections, demonstrating a major difference between mouse and human immune responses. Mutation in MYD88 at position 265 leading to a change from leucine to proline have been identified in many human lymphomas including ABC subtype of diffuse large B-cell lymphoma and Waldenström's macroglobulinemia.

== Interactions ==
Myd88 has been shown to interact with:

- IRAK1
- IRAK2
- Interleukin 1 receptor, type I
- RAC1
- TLR 4

== Gene polymorphisms ==
Various single nucleotide polymorphisms (SNPs) of the MyD88 have been identified. For some SNPs an association with susceptibility to various infectious diseases and to some autoimmune diseases like ulcerative colitis was found. SNPs that impair MyD88 protein activity cause MyD88 deficiency, an innate immune system disorder characterised by increased susceptibility to certain bacterial infections.
