= Toll-like receptor 10 =

Protein-coding gene in the species Homo sapiens

TLR10
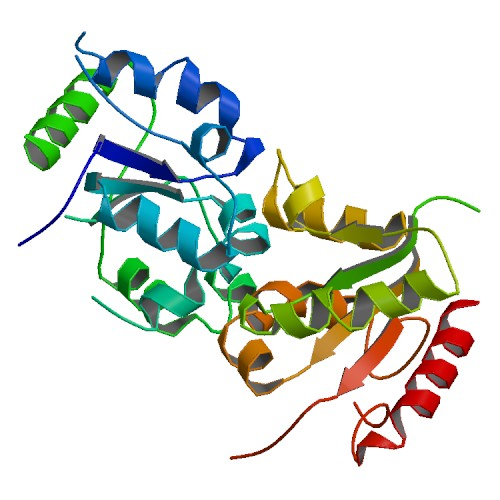

Identifiers
- Aliases: TLR10, CD290, toll like receptor 10
- External IDs: OMIM: 606270; GeneCards: TLR10
Available structures
PDB	Human UniProt search: PDBe RCSB
PDB	List of PDB id codes 2J67

Gene location (Human)
Chr.	Chromosome 4 (human)
Band	4p14	Start	38,772,238 bp
Band	4p14	End	38,782,990 bp
RNA expression pattern
Bgee	Human / Mouse (ortholog); Top expressed in: lymph node; mucosa of ileum; appendix; spleen; blood; granulocyte; monocyte; epithelium of nasopharynx; tonsil; bone marrow cell / n/a; More reference expression data
BioGPS	n/a
Gene ontology
Molecular function	transmembrane signaling receptor activity; protein binding; identical protein binding
Cellular component	integral component of membrane; plasma membrane; membrane; integral component of plasma membrane
Biological process	toll-like receptor 10 signaling pathway; inflammatory response; positive regulation of inflammatory response; MyD88-dependent toll-like receptor signaling pathway; signal transduction; immune system process; innate immune response; toll-like receptor signaling pathway; immune response
Sources:Amigo / QuickGO
Orthologs
Databases	NCBI: entry; OMA: entry
Species	Human	Mouse
Entrez	81793	n/a
Ensembl	ENSG00000174123	n/a
UniProt	Q9BXR5	n/a
RefSeq (mRNA)	NM_001017388; NM_001195106; NM_001195107; NM_001195108; NM_030956	n/a
RefSeq (protein)	NP_001017388; NP_001182035; NP_001182036; NP_001182037; NP_112218	n/a
Location (UCSC)	Chr 4: 38.77 – 38.78 Mb	n/a
PubMed search		n/a
- Wikidata
View/Edit Human

Toll-like receptor 10 is a protein that in humans is encoded by the TLR10 gene. TLR10 has also been designated as CD290 (cluster of differentiation 290). TLR10 has not been extensively studied because it is a pseudogene in mice, though all other mammalian species contain an intact copy of the TLR10 gene. Unlike other TLRs, TLR10 does not activate the immune system and has instead been shown to suppress inflammatory signaling on primary human cells. This makes TLR10 unique among the TLR family. TLR10 was thought to be an "orphan" receptor, however, recent studies have identified ligands for TLR10 and these include HIV-gp41. Ligands for TLR2 are potential ligands for TLR10.

== Function ==
The protein encoded by this gene is a member of the toll-like receptor (TLR) family which play a fundamental role in pathogen recognition and activation of innate immunity. TLRs are highly conserved from Drosophila to humans and share structural and functional similarities. They recognize pathogen-associated molecular patterns (PAMPs) that are expressed on infectious agents, and mediate the production of cytokines necessary for the development of effective immunity.

TLR10 is unique among the TLR family in having an anti-inflammatory function, rather than a pro-inflammatory function. This was discovered by over-expressing TLR10 in human cell lines and using antibody-mediated engagement of the receptor on primary human cells. When TLR10 is activated in this manner, it suppresses the amount of cytokines produced, as compared to control cells. TLR10 engagement also has long-term effects on monocyte and B cell activation/differentiation by suppressing the transcription of activation markers. TLR10's mechanism of action is not yet known but activation of the receptor has been shown to suppress NF-κB, MAP kinase and Akt signaling events stimulated by TLR and CD40 ligands. The computational analysis reported that TLR10 can interact with peptidoglycan and (triacyl) lipopeptides in concert with TLR2 (as a heterodimer).

Some ligands of TLR10 have been recently described: HIV-1 gp41, Helicobacter pylori LPS (TLR2/10), Listeria monocytogenes, B burgdorferi, H1N1/H5N1.

== Expression ==
TLR10 has been transcriptionally shown to be expressed in secondary lymphoid tissues such as the spleen, lymph nodes, and tonsils. More specifically, protein level expression of TLR10 has been shown on the surface of B cells, monocytes and neutrophils; but not on T cells. B cells have the highest expression of TLR10 among these cell types but the overall expression of TLR10 is low compared to other TLRs. TLR10 has also been shown to be produced intracellularly in monocytes and neutrophils.

Multiple alternatively spliced transcript variants encoding the same protein have been found for this gene.
