= Endothelial cell tropism =

Group of cells allowing a pathogen to infect nearby endothelium

Endothelial cell tropism or endotheliotropism is a type of tissue tropism or host tropism that characterizes an pathogen's ability to recognize and infect an endothelial cell. Pathogens, such as viruses, can target a specific tissue type or multiple tissue types. Like other cells, the endothelial cell possesses several features that supports a productive viral infection a cell including, cell surface receptors, immune responses, and other virulence factors. Endothelial cells are found in various tissue types such as in the capillaries, veins, and arteries in the human body. As endothelial cells line these blood vessels and critical networks that extend access to various human organ systems, the virus entry into these cells can be detrimental to virus spread across the host system and affect clinical course of disease. Understanding the mechanisms of how viruses attach, enter, and control endothelial functions and host responses inform infectious disease understanding and medical countermeasures.

== Cellular features and mechanisms ==
There are a multitude of endothelial cell features that influence cell tropism and ultimately, contribute to endothelial cell activation and dysfunction as well as the continuation of the virus life cycle.

=== Cell surface receptors ===
Virus Life Cycle (Simplified for RNA Viruses). Upon attaching to the cell surface, virus entry occurs via binding cell surface receptor and via endocytosis. The virus utilizes host proteins and other cell machinery to replicate. Once the viral genome has been replicated, the progeny virions are assembled and released out of the cell.

Viral pathogens capitalize on cell surface receptors that are ubiquitous and can recognize many diverse ligands for attachment and ultimately, entry into the cell. These ligands not only consist of endogenous proteins but also bacterial and viral products. Once the virus is anchored to the cell surface, virus uptake typically occurs using host mechanisms such as endocytosis. One method of viral uptake is through clathrin-mediated endocytosis (CME). The cell surface receptors provide a binding pocket for attachment and entry into the cell, and therefore, affects a cell's susceptibility to infection. In addition, the receptor density on the surface of the endothelial cell also affects how efficiently the virus enters the host cell. For instance, a lower cell surface receptor density may render an endothelial cell less susceptible for virus infection than an endothelial with a higher cell surface receptor density. The endothelium contains a myriad of cell surface receptors associated with functions such as immune cell adherence and trafficking, blood clotting, vasodilation, and barrier permeability. Given these vital functions, virus interactions with these receptors offers insight into the symptoms that present during viral pathogenesis such as inflammation, increased vascular permeability, and thrombosis.

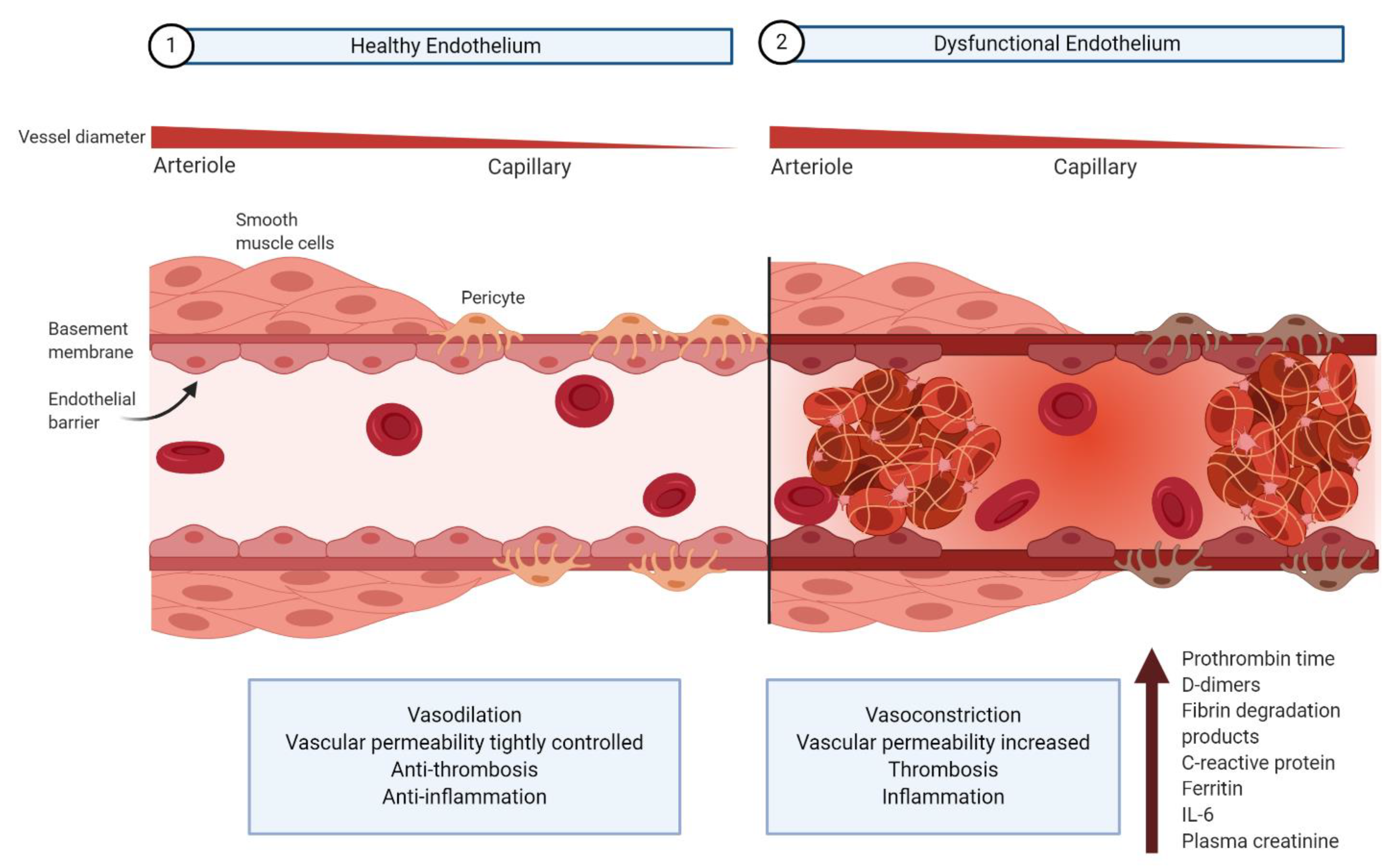
Comparison of Healthy vs. Dysfunctional Vascular Endothelium. Characteristics of endothelium at (1) homestasis and (2) damaged upon infection.

=== Transcription Factors & Viral Replication ===
After entry into the cell, these intracellular parasites require factors in the host cell to support viral replication and release of progeny virions. Specifically, the host factors include proteins, such as transcription factors and polymerases, which aid in replicating the viral genome. Therefore, the sole entry into a live host does not necessarily result in propagation for viral progeny as the cell may not contain the critical transcription factors or polymerases for virus replication. Furthermore, within the viral genome, there are not only instructions to synthesize viral proteins but also other virulence factors such as genes, cellular structures, and other regulatory processes that enable a pathogen to control the host's antiviral responses. These virulence factors can counter the host defense mechanisms that attempt eliminate the infection via the host's immune system.

=== Host defense mechanisms ===
Endothelial cells also possess intrinsic antiviral responses which leverage the host's immune system to battle the infection or restrict viral replication. In response to the virus production in the cell, the host cell can release a protein such as cytokine like interferon (IFN) that will signal for an immune response. IFN "intereferes" with virus replication by signaling to other cells in our immune system stop the infection. Other cell mechanisms are also at the different subcellular levels. Specifically, there are cellular pattern recognition receptors such as TLR7 and TLR8 (detecting RNA) and TLR9 (detecting DNA). These toll-like receptors which can distinguish if there are viral nucleic acids in the host cell and likewise, will trigger an immune response to flag the cell and attempt to eliminate the pathogen. The combination of these mechanisms that support successful virus entry, virus replication, and blocking of the host immune response contribute to a productive virus infection and replication.

== Examples and effects on viral pathogenesis ==
=== Coronaviruses ===
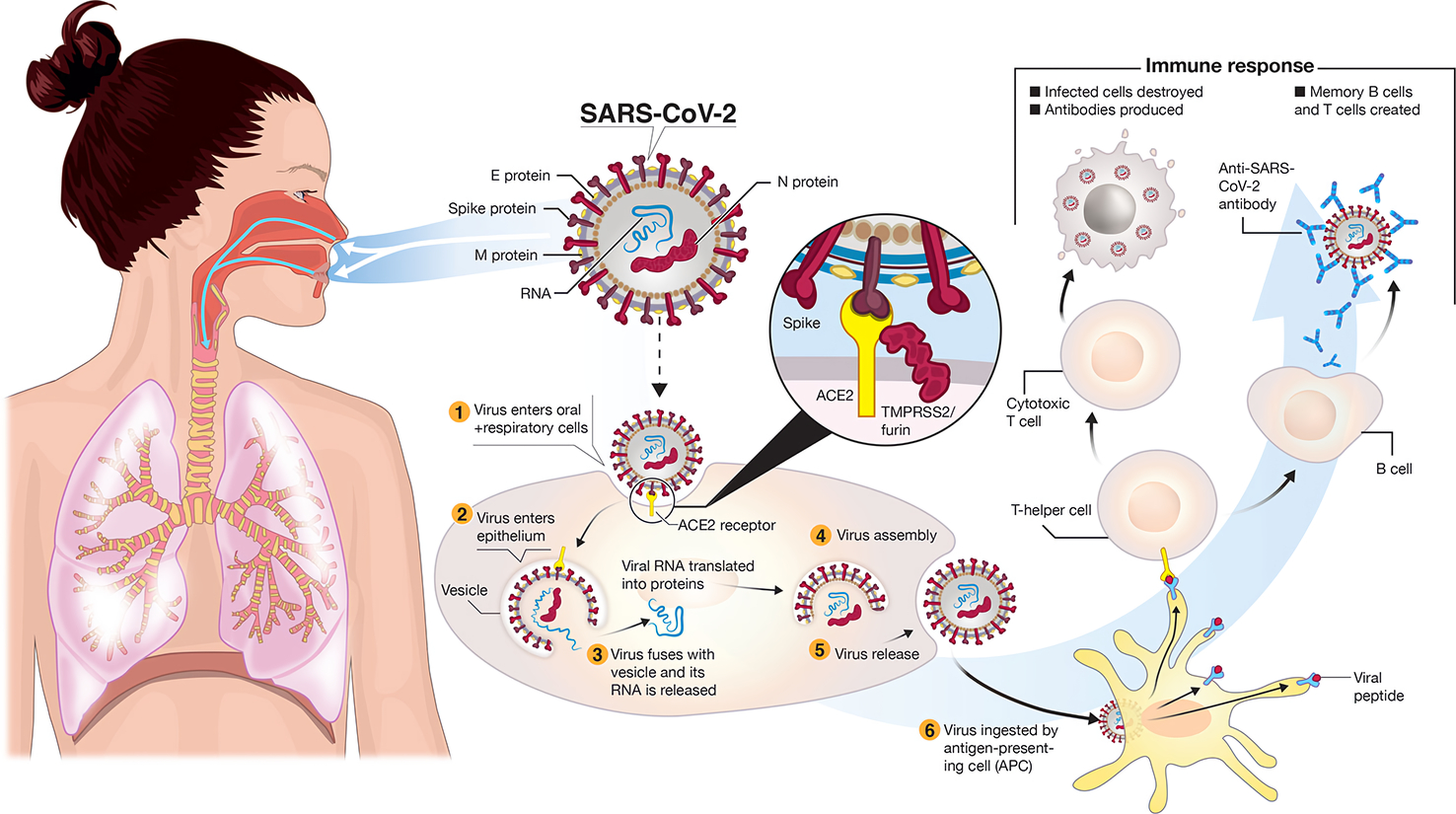
Transmission and Virus Replication Cycle of SARS-CoV-2. ACE2 is the notable entry point of SARS-CoV-2 into cells.

SARS-CoV-2 is the virus that causes the disease COVID-19 and infects different cell types, but also has shown multi-organ vascular involvement. In severe cases, SARS-CoV-2 can cause endothelial dysfunction or injury. This virus-induced endothelial responses can lead to thrombosis, congestion, and microangiopathy. The cell surface receptors associated with viral entry include ACE2 and co-receptor TMPRSS2. TMPRSS2 is needed to cleave the spike protein for viral fusion to cell membrane. However, a recent study has demonstrated that low expression of ACE2 in endothelial cells has been associated with poor ability for viral propagation due the lack of the entry points on the cell surface.

=== Flaviviruses ===
Dengue is an example of a mosquito-borne flavivirus that causes Dengue fever. While endothelial cells are not the major cell type Dengue targets, the virus binds to various cell surface receptors on endothelial cells with particular productive infection via heparan sulfate-containing cell surface receptors. The infection of the endothelium via these receptors have been indicated to impair critical immune responses and alter capillary permeability which in turn support the clinical course of the disease.

=== Filoviruses ===
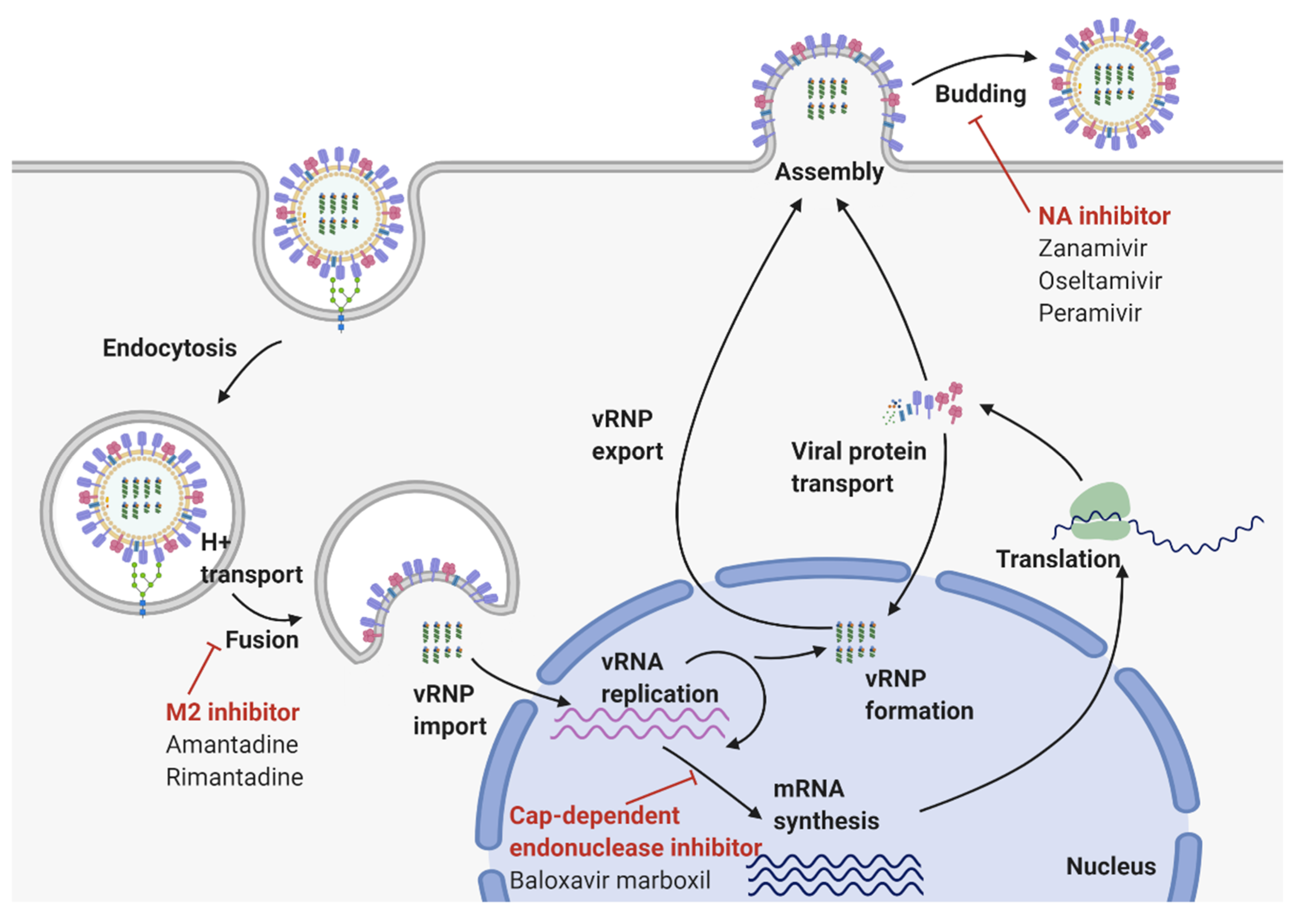
Influenza Virus Replication Life Cycle. Anti-influenza drugs target various stages of this cycle.

Ebola is one viral hemorrhagic fever virus that causes Ebola Virus Disease (EVD). Analysis of human samples of nonsurvivors of the disease have shown that the endothelium is significantly changed from the healthy state. Other alterations from homeostasis include the widespread expression of viral antigens in endothelial cells. The glycoprotein of the virus, which serves as the virus's "key" into the cell, has been indicated to majorly damage the endothelium. For instance, the liver has been highly implicated as an area of damage upon infection. Liver sinusoidal endothelial cells (LSEC) express a variety of scavenger receptors including FcγRIIb2 and mannose receptor which are critical in eliminating waste molecules in the liver but also engulf ligands via the CME pathway. In addition to supporting entry of virus, the interactions to these receptors also may also hinder the clearance of pharmaceuticals given to mitigate the infection.

=== Orthomyxoviridae ===
Influenza A H1N1 is a subtype of flu virus that targets and infects endothelial cells of the respiratory system, such as in the lung. The virus can also target the epithelium of the mucous membranes of these organ systems. Virus particles tend to exit from the lumen of the endothelium, leading to viral antigens found in the blood and lymphatic endothelial cells. However, as this virus spreads, it will be targeted to endothelial cells in lung but not in the brain, for instance.

== Applications ==
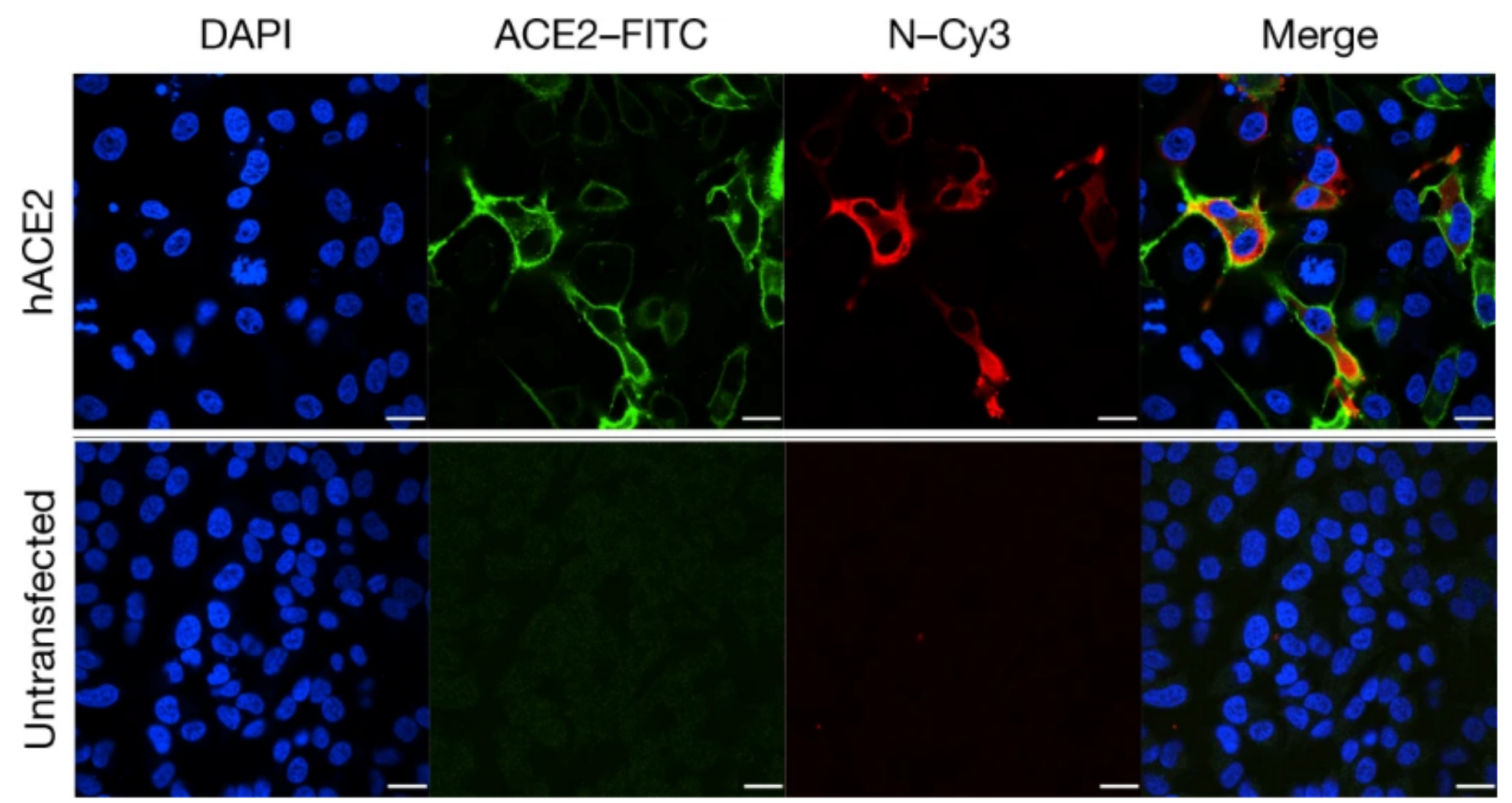
ACE2 Staining in HeLa Cells. Image adapted from: Zhou, P., Yang, XL., Wang, XG. et al. A pneumonia outbreak associated with a new coronavirus of probable bat origin. Credit: Nature 579, 270–273 (2020). https://doi.org/10.1038/s41586-020-2012-7

=== Technologies of study ===
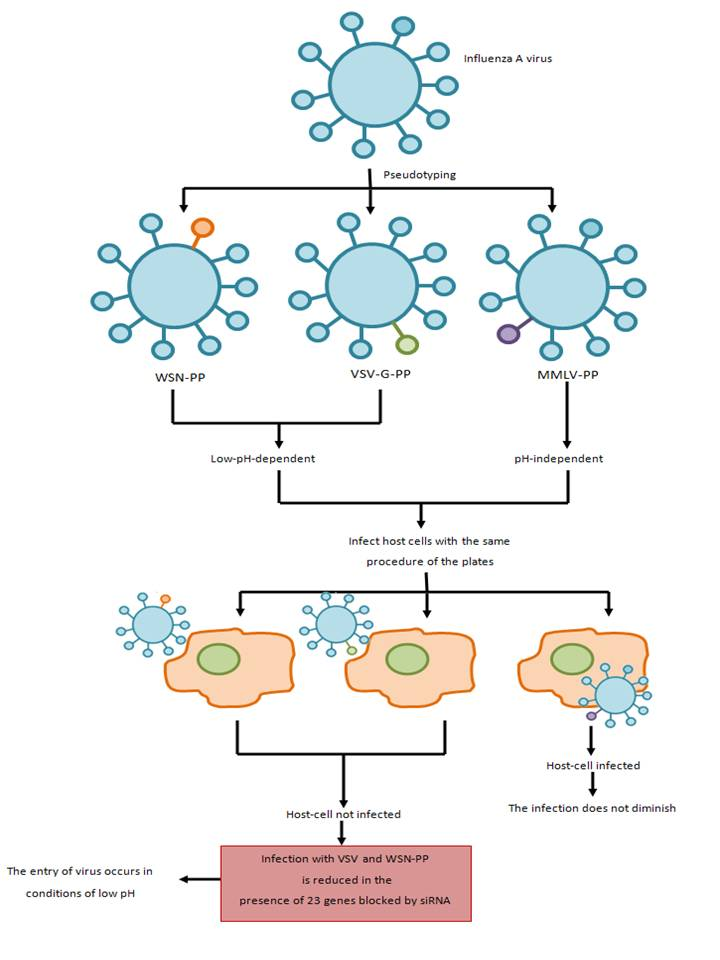
Virus Pseudotyping. Viral vectors can be inserted into the genome of surrogate viruses such as Vesicular Stomatitis Virus (VSV) and Lentiviruses (LV). Pseudotyped viruses are used in in vitro or in vivo studies.

Depending on the biosafety level (BSL) also known as the pathogen or protection level, there are different levels of biocontainment and approvals required to study the pathogen; this protection level affects how and where the pathogen is studied. While these summarizes focus on endothelial cell tropism, these techniques also apply broadly to various methods in virology. These summaries do not provide comprehensive list but are representative of common platforms to study emerging infectious diseases.

==== In vitro approaches ====
Immortalized cells offer a renewable resource to study variety of pathogens. The characterization of the endothelial tropism allows researchers to modify either the cell to display the receptor that the virus's glycoprotein interacts with to attach to the cell. However, these 2D cell cultures are not necessarily intended to mimic viral propagation or host responses in vivo. These formats of bioassays allow for investigation of virus and potentially identification of cell surface receptors or other factors involved in cell tropism. Commonly, molecular biology methods such as, immunofluorescence or immunohistochemistry, enables researchers to visualize where receptor is present on the cell. Conversely, using a surrogate or pseudotyped virus, is also a method of understanding cell tropism. In brief, these approaches typically take a different and well-characterized pathogen such as Vesicular Stomatitis Virus (VSV) and modify it so that it displays the glycoprotein of another virus of interest. As the glycoprotein serves as the "key" into the cell, this method allows study of entry into the cell independent of the other processes in the virus life cycle. The further growing or serial passaging of this recombinant virus can demonstrate how the virus evolves or mutates to support infection efficiency.

==== In vivo models of infection ====
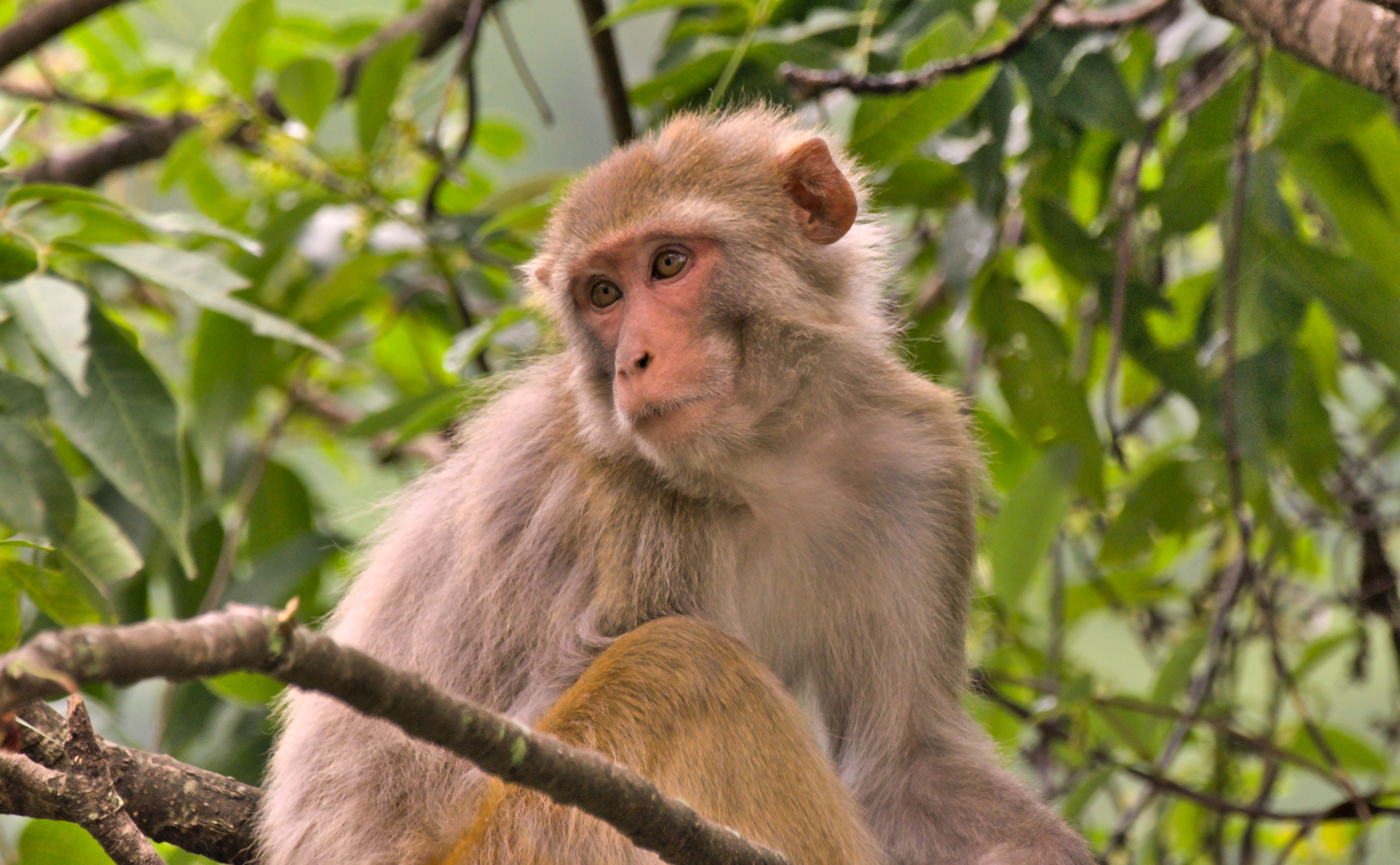
Rhesus Macaque Monkey. The macaque monkeys come in various species. Model of infections include these captive nonhuman primates.

Nonhuman primates such as rhesus macaques serve as the "gold standard" approach for animal models for many BSL4 pathogens when the biological phenomenon cannot be studied in other species. As many infectious diseases are zoonotic in nature, modeling these diseases in these macaque species which have some biological similarities to humans provide insight into disease understanding in circumstances which a virus is poorly understood and treatment options are limited or nonexistent. The readouts of these models can be evaluated through tissue samples or blood samples, for instance. However, these in vivo models of infection such as rodent and nonhuman primate models have presented ethical concerns and shortcomings as it involves laboratory confinement of an animal and introducing to it a disease insult. The emergence of advanced in vivo including humanized or transgenic rodent models provide an alternative to the macaque series but also harbor concerns if these models recapitulate human physiology or are predictive of human-like responses to a disease or therapeutic. These models involve genetically modifying and/or transplanting human tissue into a rodent model. In conjunction to in vitro cell-based assays, these in vivo models are critical to validate therapeutics during drug discovery and development.

=== Drug discovery and development ===
Endothelial cell tropism informs medical countermeasures in response to an emerging infectious diseases. These medical countermeasures include how therapeutics such as small molecules compounds and vaccines are developed.

==== Antivirals and other small molecule drugs ====
Antiviral drugs are therapeutics which aid the human body to eliminate an infection, mitigate symptoms of the infection, and/or decrease the clinical course of disease. The understanding of endothelial cell tropism introduces is used in discovery of antiviral drug targets. Many mechanisms of actions of these therapeutics first target the virus life cycle. These drugs come in the form of small molecule compounds or other biotherapeutics (e.g., monoclonal antibody therapies). In cell-based, high-throughput drug screening, cell tropism is an important consideration during cell type selection. The cell type in these assays should display the targeted receptor to representatively validate the drug's proposed mechanism of action and determine its potency, safety, and efficacy in vitro. Furthermore, other aspects of endothelial cell tropism lend themselves to therapeutic approaches. These aspects includes the diverse mechanisms of how endothelial cells detect viruses and respond to infection. For instance, the endothelial barrier serves as both as a protective barrier and mediator for immune responses against foreign bodies. However, the endothelial barrier is subjected to damage as a result of viral infection. Therapeutics that enhance or regain the integrity endothelial barrier after it has been damaged have been considered as potential targets for emerging infectious diseases like COVID-19, Ebola, Dengue fever, and more. Altogether, the investigation of endothelial cells tropism can provide insight into appropriate therapeutic interventions.

Table 1. Examples of Antiviral Therapeutics Targeting Endothelial Functions & the Virus Life Cycle
Group	Drug(s)	Mechanism of Action	References
Viral Entry Inhibitors	Maraviroc Inmazeb	Blocks receptor engagement, endocytosis/macropinocytosis, attachment, fusion or signaling involved uptake of the virus	
Viral Protein Synthesis Inhibitors	Lopinavir/ritonavir	Suppresses or slows virus replication by disrupting processes involved in translation or generation of protein	
Viral Polymerase Inhibitors	Molnupiravir	Interferes with regulation of transcription of viral proteins during viral replication	
Immunomodulators	Nitazoxanide	Interfere and counter with host regulated pathways during viral replication (e.g., IFN pathways and mechanism of viral RNA sensing)	

==== Vaccines ====
Vaccines are therapeutics that are preventative measure to infectious diseases. These therapeutics offer the body adaptive immunity to a specific pathogen. Fundamentally, vaccines provide patients protection by eliciting an immune response so that they develop antibodies that will help protect against the invading pathogen. The development, production, and global distribution of these vaccines is imperative to prevent, control, and eradicate pandemic potential pathogens. Specifically, cell cultured-based vaccine technologies utilize cell lines that have a wide range of viral tropism to adapt virus strains used in the development of vaccines to new cells. This application of cell tropism evaluates the diverse viral entry pathways and host receptors to accomplish this goal. Moreover, the aspects endothelial cell activation and dysfunction become important readouts during vaccine development as they are part the hallmarks of many clinical courses of infectious diseases. One of the most promising vaccine candidates for Ebola is Merck's recombinant VSV-EBOV vaccine, Ervebo. The vaccine was critical during the end of 2014/2015 Ebola outbreak in Guinea. Ervebo was shown to be effective in nonhuman primate and later in Guinea during the authorized human efficacy trial which showed that Ervebo was also highly protective in humans. The vaccine employs VSV as the surrogate to display the Ebola glycoprotein. VSV does not cause disease in humans which renders it a useful backbone to hold an important protein of Zaire Ebola virus. When the vaccine is administered, the recombinant VSV introduces a functional Ebola virus glycoprotein which interacts with endothelial cell barrier and elicit a rapid immune response without causing disease in patients. Therefore, the development and scaling of vaccines involves important considerations to endothelial cell tropism.
