= CU-CPT9a =

Chemical compound

Identifiers
- IUPAC name: 4-(7-methoxyquinolin-4-yl)-2-methylphenol
- CAS Number: 2165340-32-7
- PubChem CID: 135567383
- ChemSpider: 65323639
- UNII: 6BNV86VAQ8

Chemical and physical data
- Formula: C_{17}H_{15}NO_{2}
- Molar mass: 265.312 g·mol^{−1}
- 3D model (JSmol): Interactive image
- SMILES: CC1=C(C=CC(=C1)C2=C3C=CC(=CC3=NC=C2)OC)O
- InChI: InChI=1S/C17H15NO2/c1-11-9-12(3-6-17(11)19)14-7-8-18-16-10-13(20-2)4-5-15(14)16/h3-10,19H,1-2H3; Key:HNYBTVKYLVLWCB-UHFFFAOYSA-N

CU-CPT9a is a drug which acts as a potent and selective antagonist of Toll-like receptor 8 (TLR8), with an IC_{50} of 0.5nM. Activation of toll-like receptors triggers release of cytokines and other signalling factors, leading to inflammation. This is an essential part of the immune system's response to infection, but chronic activation of TLR signalling is thought to be involved in various inflammatory and autoimmune disorders. CU-CPT9a has immunosuppressant properties, and may have applications in the treatment of autoimmune disorders, as well as being used in scientific research into the function of TLR8.

== See also ==
- CU-CPT4a
- Imiquimod
- Motolimod
