= AXC-715 =

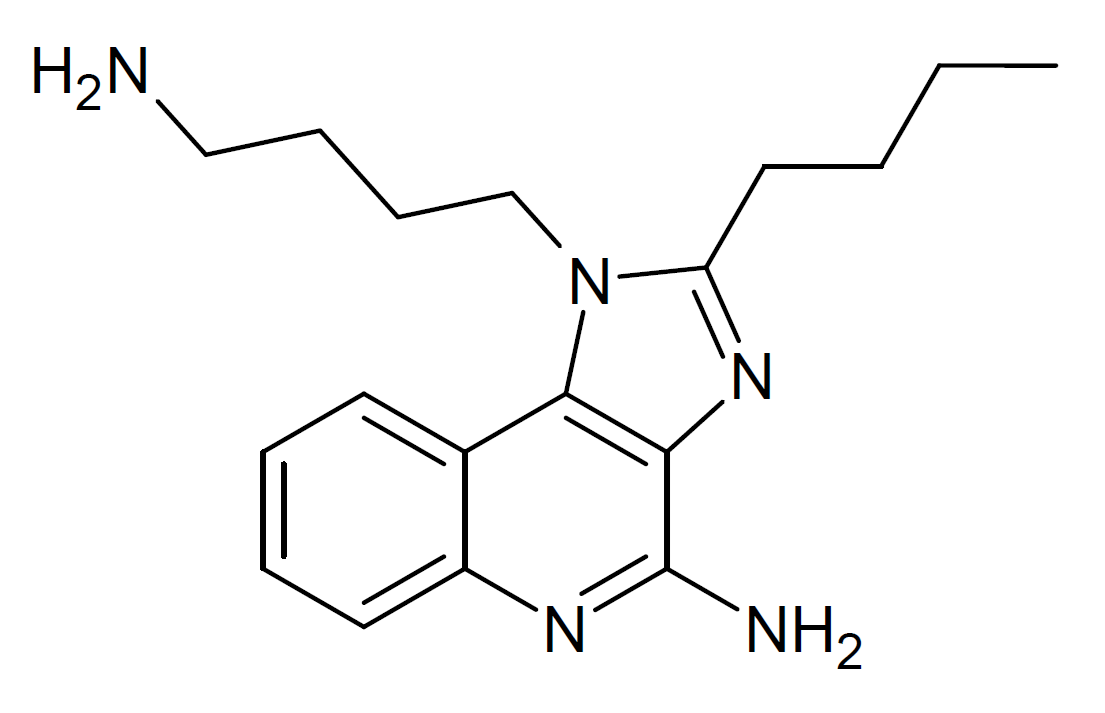

Identifiers
- IUPAC name: 1-(4-aminobutyl)-2-butylimidazo[4,5-c]quinolin-4-amine
- CAS Number: 313350-31-1
- PubChem CID: 15538226
- ChEMBL: ChEMBL5614119

Chemical and physical data
- Formula: C_{18}H_{25}N_{5}
- Molar mass: 311.433 g·mol^{−1}
- 3D model (JSmol): Interactive image
- SMILES: CCCCC1=NC2=C(N1CCCCN)C3=CC=CC=C3N=C2N
- InChI: InChI=1S/C18H25N5/c1-2-3-10-15-22-16-17(23(15)12-7-6-11-19)13-8-4-5-9-14(13)21-18(16)20/h4-5,8-9H,2-3,6-7,10-12,19H2,1H3,(H2,20,21); Key:IGZKWNHHWYBLOU-UHFFFAOYSA-N

AXC-715 is a drug which acts as an agonist at Toll-like receptor 7 (TLR7) and Toll-like receptor 8 (TLR8), with modest selectivity for TLR7. It acts as an immunostimulant, and has broad spectrum antiviral effects in animal models, and is also of interest as a potential anti-cancer drug.
