= Censavudine =

Investigational new anti-HIV drug

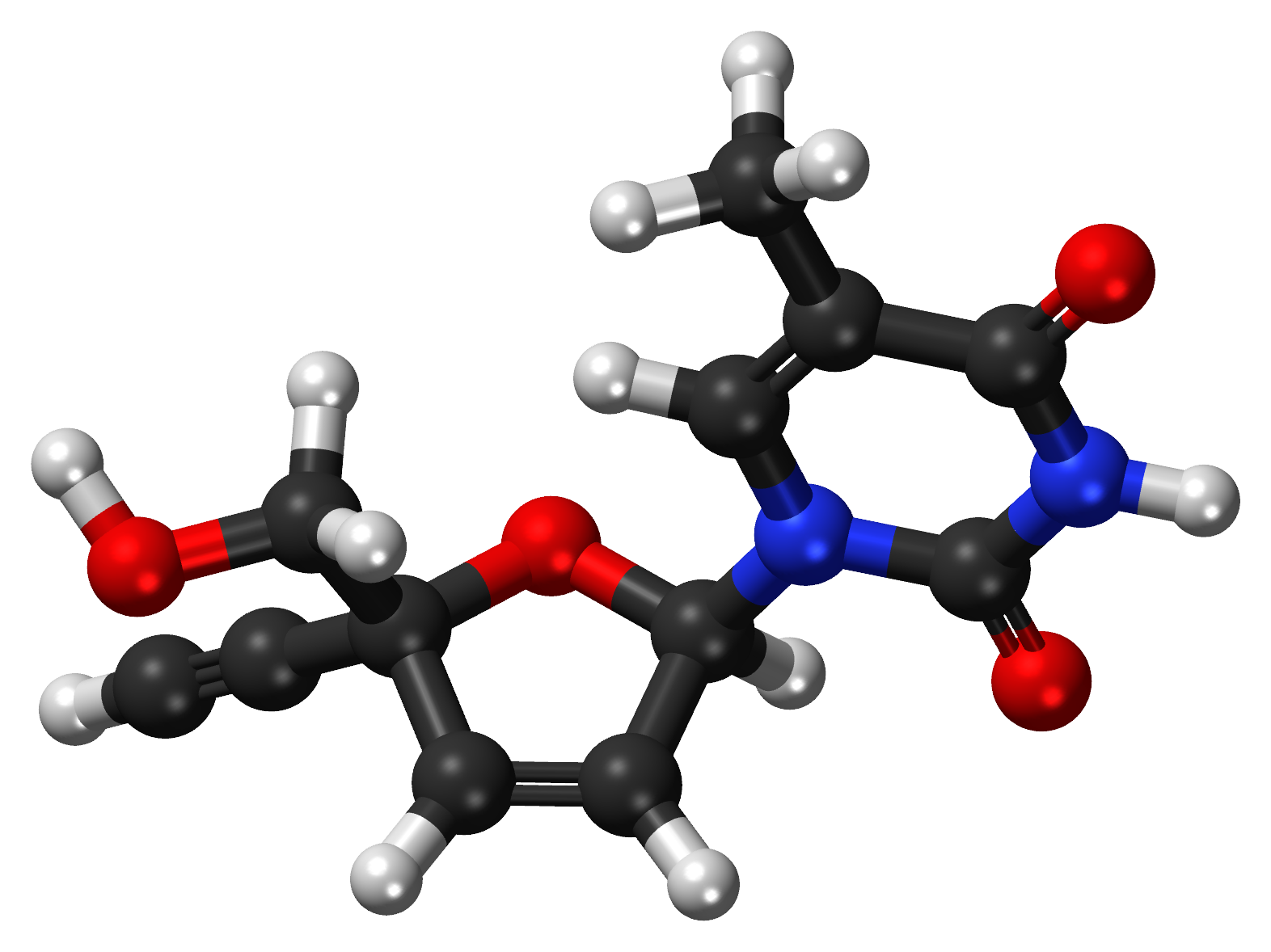

Clinical data
- Other names: 4'-ethynylstavudine, festinavir

Legal status
- Legal status: Investigational

Identifiers
- IUPAC name: 1-[(2R,5R)-5-ethynyl-5-(hydroxymethyl)-2H-furan-2-yl]-5-methylpyrimidine-2,4-dione
- CAS Number: 634907-30-5
- PubChem CID: 3008897
- ChemSpider: 2278330
- UNII: 6IE83O6NGA
- KEGG: D10550
- ChEMBL: ChEMBL124363
- NIAID ChemDB: 209894
- CompTox Dashboard (EPA): DTXSID50212893
- ECHA InfoCard: 100.225.812

Chemical and physical data
- Formula: C_{12}H_{12}N_{2}O_{4}
- Molar mass: 248.238 g·mol^{−1}
- 3D model (JSmol): Interactive image
- SMILES: CC1=CN(C(=O)NC1=O)[C@H]2C=C[C@](O2)(CO)C#C
- InChI: InChI=1S/C12H12N2O4/c1-3-12(7-15)5-4-9(18-12)14-6-8(2)10(16)13-11(14)17/h1,4-6,9,15H,7H2,2H3,(H,13,16,17)/t9-,12+/m1/s1; Key:OSYWBJSVKUFFSU-SKDRFNHKSA-N

Censavudine (INN; development code BMS-986001 in Bristol Myers-Squibb, OBP-601 in Oncolys Biopharma Inc. and TPN-101 in Transposon Therapuetics, Inc.) is an investigational new drug being developed by Bristol Myers-Squibb for the treatment of HIV infection. It was originally developed at Yale University. It is still in an investigational phase of development as of 2023.

== Renaming ==
Until 2013, censavudine has been known as festinavir, but the name was changed to avoid confusion with HIV protease inhibitors which all bear class suffix "–navir" (e.g. tipranavir, lopinavir, saquinavir, etc.).
