= Priti Krishtel =

Lawyer and patent reform activist

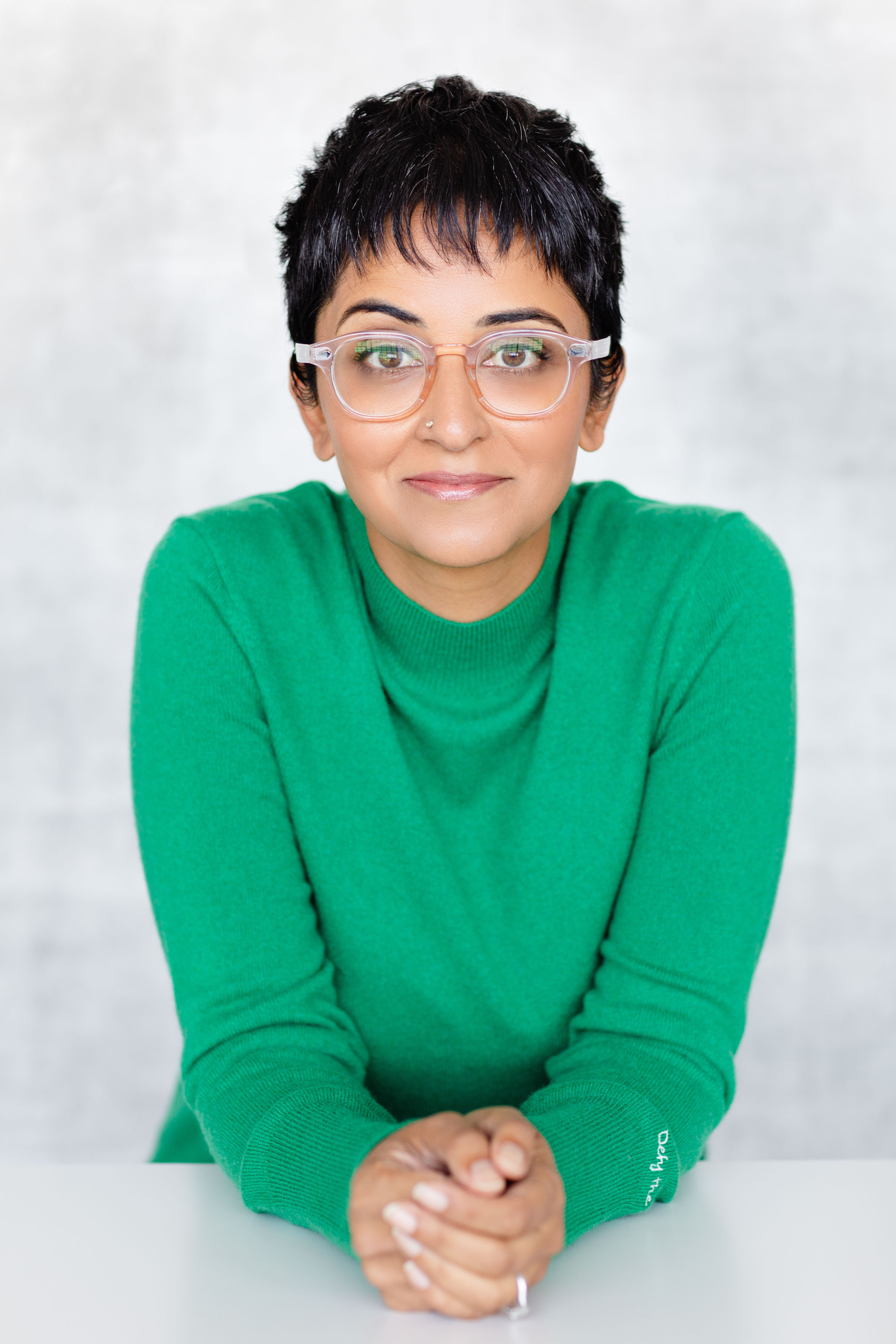
- Priti Krishtel in 2021
- Education: University of California, Berkeley, New York University
- Organization: Initiative for Medicines, Access, and Knowledge
- Known for: Pharmaceutical patent reform activism

Priti Krishtel is a lawyer and advocate for patent reform and increased public participation in the patent system. She co-founded the United States-based nonprofit organization the Initiative for Medicines, Access, and Knowledge.

She is a media contributor for national and international news outlets, a MacArthur Fellow, a TED speaker, and a Presidential Leadership Scholar.

== Early life and education ==
Krishtel grew up in California. She obtained her undergraduate degree from University of California, Berkeley, and her Juris Doctor degree from the New York University School of Law.

== Career ==
Krishtel started her career in the early 2000s while working as a public interest lawyer in India at the height of the HIV/AIDS epidemic. She saw first-hand how patent monopolies often reduced the availability of life-saving medications in lower-income countries. After meeting fellow lawyer Tahir Amin at a protest about HIV drug prices in Bangalore, Krishtel and Amin co-founded the Initiative for Medicines, Access, and Knowledge to use their legal background to expose inequities in the patent system to increase access to affordable, life-saving medications for people around the world.

Krishtel has partnered with patient groups and humanitarian organizations, including Doctors Without Borders (Médecins Sans Frontières), to challenge patents by Gilead Sciences on hepatitis C treatment sofosbuvir, a patent application by Novartis from patenting leukemia drug Gleevec, and Abbott Laboratories patents on the HIV drug Kaletra. These challenges resulted in increased patient access to medicines and public savings for governments and health systems.

== Media ==
In 2018, Krishtel stated that public enthusiasm for intellectual property rights reform is at an all-time high due to concerns around the rising costs of prescription drugs. In 2020 she pointed to research showing no correlation between high drug prices and increased pharmaceutical research and development. She has said that many medicinal patent applications, rather than being for new medicinal formulas, are minor tweaks to drug administration regimes or processes.

In 2021, she called for reforms by the U.S. Patent and Trademark Office to ensure US pharmaceutical companies do not abuse the patent system to extend their market monopolies. This effort was amplified during the COVID vaccine debate. In August 2021, she pointed out that 55% of people in developed countries have been vaccinated, while for people in developing countries, the number is 1%. In the same year, she joined global health advocates in calling for equitable access to COVID-19 vaccines, treatments, and tests through sharing intellectual property and know-how to increase supply and access.

Krishtel has called out the danger of vaccine nationalism, or the hoarding of vaccine supply by any country, and warned that the prioritization of vaccines for American citizens or other high-income countries could be "the beginning of a new Hunger Games" where populations are pitted against each other to get access to treatments and vaccines if measures were not taken. In 2021, she stated that intellectual property law reform alone would not be enough to improve access to COVID-19 vaccines and that technology transfer was also needed.

Responding to criticism of the technology transfer argument in which it was said that local manufacturing of vaccines increased safety risks, she told CBS News that such defenses of the status quo were patronizing and racist assumptions grounded in the false perspective that low-income countries lacked manufacturing capacity and a safety regulatory framework.

In an interview with Amanpour & Company on PBS regarding COVID-19 vaccine access, she noted that everyone should have access to vaccines. This sentiment was echoed in an op-ed she co-authored with Chelsea Clinton in USA Today on the need to vaccinate the world to stop the spread of further variants, stating, "Nobody is safe until we are all safe."

In 2021, Krishtel joined the Speaker of the U.S. House of Representatives at a press conference and noted the importance of addressing patent and other anti-competitive abuses as part of the response to lowering healthcare costs during a legislative effort on drug pricing. She is quoted in the New York Times editorial board opinion in April 2022 supporting patent reform.

== Awards and recognition ==
Krishtel is a TED speaker, Presidential Leadership Scholar, and an Ashoka fellow. She is an Echoing Green Fellow and received the Distinguished Alumni Achievement Award from NYU's School of Law in 2022. She was awarded a MacArthur Fellowship in 2022.
