= RG7795 =

Chemical compound

Clinical data
- Other names: RG-7795; ANA773; ANA-773

Legal status
- Legal status: Investigational

Identifiers
- CAS Number: 892498-64-5
- PubChem CID: 11587892
- DrugBank: DB06329
- ChemSpider: 9762656
- UNII: QTI86134YL

Chemical and physical data
- Formula: C_{12}H_{14}N_{4}O_{5}S
- Molar mass: 326.33 g·mol^{−1}
- 3D model (JSmol): Interactive image
- SMILES: O=C1N(C=2C(S1)=CN=C(N)N2)[C@]3([C@H](OC(C)=O)C[C@@H](CO)O3)[H]
- InChI: InChI=1S/C12H14N4O5S/c1-5(18)20-7-2-6(4-17)21-10(7)16-9-8(22-12(16)19)3-14-11(13)15-9/h3,6-7,10,17H,2,4H2,1H3,(H2,13,14,15)/t6-,7+,10+/m0/s1; Key:HOOMGTNENMZAFP-NYNCVSEMSA-N

RG7795 (previously ANA773) is an antiviral drug candidate that as of 2015 had been in Phase II trials in hepatitis B. It is an orally-available prodrug of isatoribine, that was under development by Anadys Pharmaceuticals when it was acquired by Roche in 2011. Its active metabolite is an agonist of TLR7; activation of TLR7 causes secretion of endogenous type 1 interferons, which have antiviral activity.

Chemical structure of isatoribine

As of 2021, development of RG7795 appears to be discontinued.
