= Vesatolimod =

Chemical compound

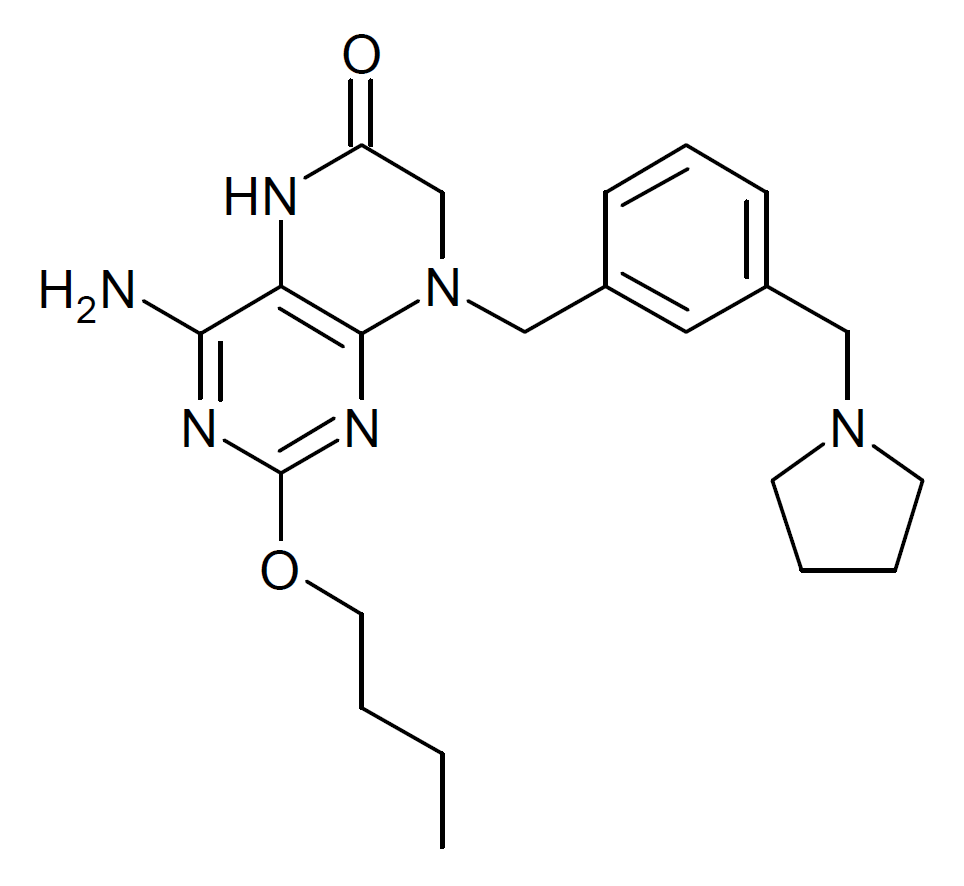

Identifiers
- IUPAC name: 4-amino-2-butoxy-8-{[3-(pyrrolidin-1-ylmethyl)phenyl]methyl}-5,7-dihydropteridin-6-one
- CAS Number: 1228585-88-3
- PubChem CID: 46241268
- DrugBank: DB12687
- ChemSpider: 27289075
- UNII: O8M467C50G
- KEGG: D11003
- ChEMBL: ChEMBL2424780
- CompTox Dashboard (EPA): DTXSID40153741

Chemical and physical data
- Formula: C_{22}H_{30}N_{6}O_{2}
- Molar mass: 410.522 g·mol^{−1}
- 3D model (JSmol): Interactive image
- SMILES: CCCCOC1=NC(=C2C(=N1)N(CC(=O)N2)CC3=CC=CC(=C3)CN4CCCC4)N
- InChI: InChI=1S/C22H30N6O2/c1-2-3-11-30-22-25-20(23)19-21(26-22)28(15-18(29)24-19)14-17-8-6-7-16(12-17)13-27-9-4-5-10-27/h6-8,12H,2-5,9-11,13-15H2,1H3,(H,24,29)(H2,23,25,26); Key:VFOKSTCIRGDTBR-UHFFFAOYSA-N

Vesatolimod (GS-9620) is an antiviral drug developed by Gilead Sciences, which acts as a potent and selective agonist of Toll-like receptor 7 (TLR7), a receptor involved in the regulation of the immune system. It is used to stimulate the immune system, which can increase its ability to combat chronic viral infections. Vesatolimod is in clinical trials to determine whether it is safe and effective in patients with Hepatitis B and HIV/AIDS, and has also shown activity against other viral diseases such as norovirus and enterovirus 71.

== See also ==
- Imiquimod
- Motolimod
