= Toll-like receptor 3 =

Protein found in humans

TLR3
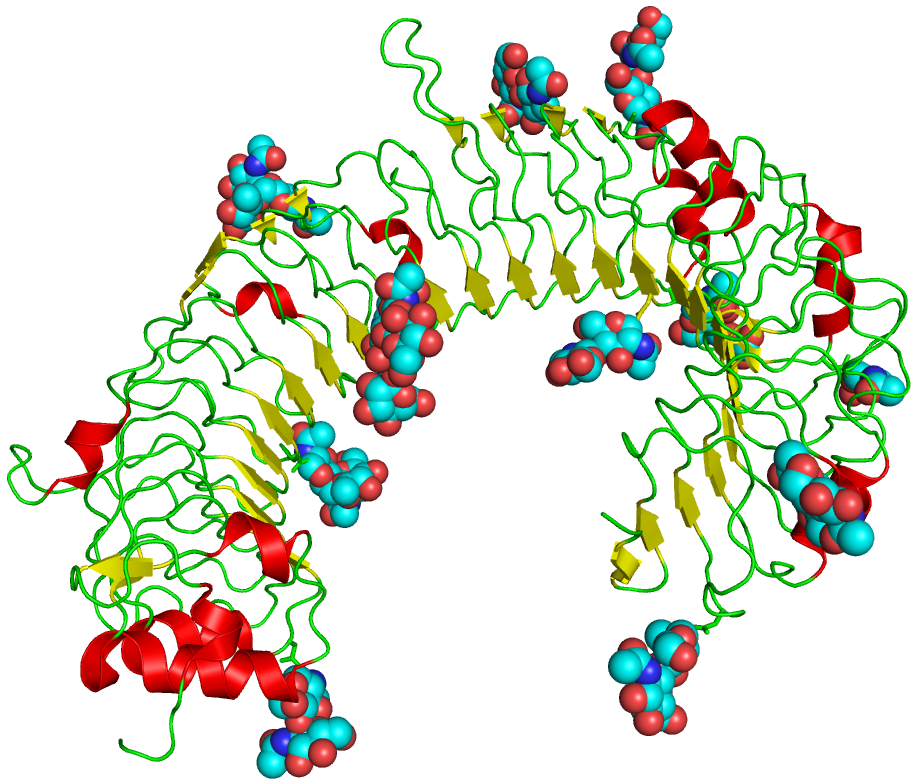

Identifiers
- Aliases: TLR3, CD283, IIAE2, toll like receptor 3, IMD83
- External IDs: OMIM: 603029; MGI: 2156367; GeneCards: TLR3
Available structures
PDB	Ortholog search: PDBe RCSB
PDB	List of PDB id codes 1ZIW, 2A0Z, 3ULU, 3ULV, 2MK9, 2MKA

Gene location (Human)
Chr.	Chromosome 4 (human)
Band	4q35.1	Start	186,069,155 bp
Band	4q35.1	End	186,088,073 bp

Gene location (Mouse)
Chr.	Chromosome 8 (mouse)
Band	8|8 B1.1	Start	45,848,702 bp
Band	8|8 B1.1	End	45,864,117 bp
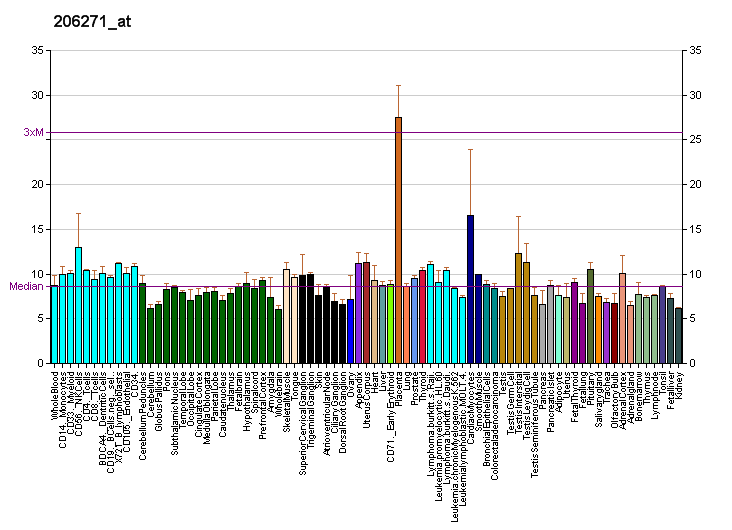
RNA expression pattern
Bgee	Human / Mouse (ortholog); Top expressed in: jejunal mucosa; palpebral conjunctiva; placenta; rectum; sperm; duodenum; gallbladder; Achilles tendon; epithelium of colon; pancreatic epithelial cell / Top expressed in: conjunctival fornix; gastrula; stria vascularis; transitional epithelium of urinary bladder; vestibular membrane of cochlear duct; vestibular sensory epithelium; secondary oocyte; lumbar subsegment of spinal cord; Epithelium of choroid plexus; jejunum; More reference expression data
BioGPS	More reference expression data
Gene ontology
Molecular function	protein binding; identical protein binding; RNA binding; double-stranded RNA binding; transmembrane signaling receptor activity; signaling receptor activity
Cellular component	cytoplasm; integral component of membrane; endosome; endoplasmic reticulum membrane; membrane; Golgi membrane; integral component of plasma membrane; intracellular anatomical structure; cell surface; lysosomal membrane; early endosome; endoplasmic reticulum; endolysosome membrane; endosome membrane; extracellular space; extracellular matrix
Biological process	positive regulation of interferon-beta production; response to dsRNA; defense response; positive regulation of toll-like receptor signaling pathway; positive regulation of protein phosphorylation; male gonad development; positive regulation of inflammatory response; positive regulation of interleukin-12 production; positive regulation of type III interferon production; cellular response to interferon-beta; response to exogenous dsRNA; negative regulation of osteoclast differentiation; positive regulation of cytokine production; immune system process; response to virus; activation of NF-kappaB-inducing kinase activity; I-kappaB phosphorylation; positive regulation of JNK cascade; hyperosmotic response; cellular response to dsRNA; regulation of dendritic cell cytokine production; microglial cell activation; toll-like receptor signaling pathway; TRIF-dependent toll-like receptor signaling pathway; cellular response to mechanical stimulus; microglial cell activation involved in immune response; positive regulation of gene expression; defense response to bacterium; positive regulation of NF-kappaB transcription factor activity; defense response to virus; necroptotic signaling pathway; positive regulation of interleukin-8 production; cellular response to exogenous dsRNA; positive regulation of interleukin-6 production; positive regulation of tumor necrosis factor production; cellular response to interferon-gamma; positive regulation of chemokine production; positive regulation of apoptotic process; positive regulation of I-kappaB kinase/NF-kappaB signaling; detection of virus; inflammatory response; innate immune response; I-kappaB kinase/NF-kappaB signaling; toll-like receptor 3 signaling pathway; positive regulation of type I interferon production; MyD88-independent toll-like receptor signaling pathway; signal transduction; positive regulation of transcription by RNA polymerase II; necroptosis; apoptotic signaling pathway; negative regulation of MyD88-independent toll-like receptor signaling pathway; extrinsic apoptotic signaling pathway; positive regulation of angiogenesis; positive regulation of NIK/NF-kappaB signaling
Sources:Amigo / QuickGO
Orthologs
Databases	NCBI: entry; OMA: entry
Species	Human	Mouse
Entrez	7098	142980
Ensembl	ENSG00000164342	ENSMUSG00000031639
UniProt	O15455	Q99MB1
RefSeq (mRNA)	NM_003265	NM_126166; NM_001357316; NM_001357317
RefSeq (protein)	NP_003256	NP_569054; NP_001344245; NP_001344246
Location (UCSC)	Chr 4: 186.07 – 186.09 Mb	Chr 8: 45.85 – 45.86 Mb
PubMed search
- Wikidata
View/Edit Human	View/Edit Mouse

Toll-like receptor 3 (TLR3) also known as CD283 (cluster of differentiation 283) is a protein that in humans is encoded by the TLR3 gene. TLR3 is a member of the toll-like receptor family of pattern recognition receptors of the innate immune system. TLR3 recognizes double-stranded RNA in endosomes, which is a common feature of viral genomes internalised by macrophages and dendritic cells.

== Structure ==
Toll-like receptor 3 (TLR3) is a type I transmembrane receptor consisting of an extracellular ectodomain (PF13855, PF13516), a single transmembrane helix (PF17968), and a cytoplasmic Toll/interleukin-1 receptor (TIR) signaling domain (PF01582). Its ectodomain forms a large horseshoe-shaped solenoid built from 23 leucine-rich repeats (LRRs), each stabilized by conserved asparagine residues that create extensive hydrogen-bonding networks along the coil, with specialized N- and C-terminal cap domains closing off the horseshoe's ends.

== Function ==
TLR3 is a member of the toll-like receptor (TLR) family which plays a fundamental role in pathogen recognition and activation of innate immunity. TLRs are highly conserved from Drosophila to humans and share structural and functional similarities. They recognize pathogen-associated molecular patterns (PAMPs) that are expressed on infectious agents, and mediate the production of cytokines necessary for the development of effective immunity. The various TLRs exhibit different patterns of expression. This receptor is most abundantly expressed in placenta and pancreas, and is restricted to the dendritic subpopulation of the leukocytes. It recognizes dsRNA associated with viral infection, and induces the activation of IRF3 and NF-κB. Unlike other TLRs, TLR3 uses TRIF as the sole adaptor. IRF3 ultimately induces the production of type I interferons. It may thus play a role in host defense against viruses.

TLR3 recognizes double-stranded RNA, a form of genetic information carried by some viruses such as reoviruses. Additionally, an ephemeral form of double-stranded RNA exists as a replicative intermediate during virus replication. Upon recognition, TLR3 induces the activation of IRF3 to increase production of type I interferons which signal other cells to increase their antiviral defenses. Double-stranded RNA is also recognised by the cytoplasmic receptors RIG-I and MDA-5.

TLR3 displays a protective role in mouse models of atherosclerosis, and activation of TLR3 signaling is associated with ischemic preconditioning-induced protection against brain ischemia and attenuation of reactive astrogliosis. Furthermore, TLR3 activation has been shown to promote hair follicle regeneration in skin wound healing. In addition, TLR3 activators show effects on human vascular cells.

== Ligands ==
Agonists

- Natural dsRNA, from viruses and some dead cells
- Synthetic dsRNA such as poly(I:C), poly(A:U), RGC100, NexaVant
- Endogenous mRNA, presumably due to secondary structure (stems resemble dsRNA)
- PVP-057 (small molecule)
- Various minibinder proteins (allosteric)

Antagonists

- CU-CPT4a (competitive)

There is a minimum dsRNA size required to effectively trigger TLR3. This size is lower than the activation threshold for MDA5, another dsRNA sensor with higher inflammatory and cytotoxic potential. As a result, synthetic dsRNA can be made to avoid MDA5 activation by controlling the size of the molecule.
