= RGC100 =

Immune stimulant drug

RGC100 is an immune stimulant drug. It is a double-stranded RNA molecule of 100 G:C base pairs, with a molecular weight of 64.9 KDa. It activates dendritic cells of the human immune system by specifically targeting endosomal TLR3, while mostly avoiding MDA5. It has good solubility and serum stability.
