= CU-CPT4a =

Chemical compound

Identifiers
- IUPAC name: (2R)-2-[(3-chloro-6-fluoro-1-benzothiophene-2-carbonyl)amino]-3-phenylpropanoic acid
- CAS Number: 1279713-77-7
- PubChem CID: 53242268
- ChemSpider: 30774264
- ChEMBL: ChEMBL4303728

Chemical and physical data
- Formula: C_{18}H_{13}ClFNO_{3}S
- Molar mass: 377.81 g·mol^{−1}
- 3D model (JSmol): Interactive image
- SMILES: C1=CC=C(C=C1)C[C@H](C(=O)O)NC(=O)C2=C(C3=C(S2)C=C(C=C3)F)Cl
- InChI: InChI=1S/C18H13ClFNO3S/c19-15-12-7-6-11(20)9-14(12)25-16(15)17(22)21-13(18(23)24)8-10-4-2-1-3-5-10/h1-7,9,13H,8H2,(H,21,22)(H,23,24)/t13-/m1/s1; Key:IAASQMCXDRISAV-CYBMUJFWSA-N

CU-CPT4a is a drug which acts as a selective antagonist of Toll-like receptor 3 (TLR3), with an IC_{50} of 3.44 μM. It is used for research into the function of TRL3 and its role in inflammation, autoimmune disorders and cancer.

== See also ==
- CU-CPT9a
