= Tissue tropism =

Range of tissues that support pathogen growth

Tissue tropism is the range of cells and tissues of a host that support growth of a particular pathogen, such as a virus, bacterium or parasite.

Some bacteria and viruses have a broad tissue tropism and can infect many types of cells and tissues. Other viruses may infect primarily a single tissue. For example, rabies virus affects primarily neuronal tissue. Similarly, JC virus (JCV) primarily affects and resides in kidneys.

== Influencing factors ==
Factors influencing viral tissue tropism include:

- The presence of cellular receptors permitting viral entry.
- Availability of transcription factors involved in viral replication.
- The molecular nature of the viral tropogen or virus surface, such as the glycoprotein, which interacts with the corresponding cell receptor.

The cellular receptors are the proteins found on a cell or viral surface. These receptors are like keys, allowing the viral cell to fuse with or attach itself to a cell. The way that these proteins are acquired is through a similar process to that of an infection cycle.

== How 'tropic' tissue is acquired ==
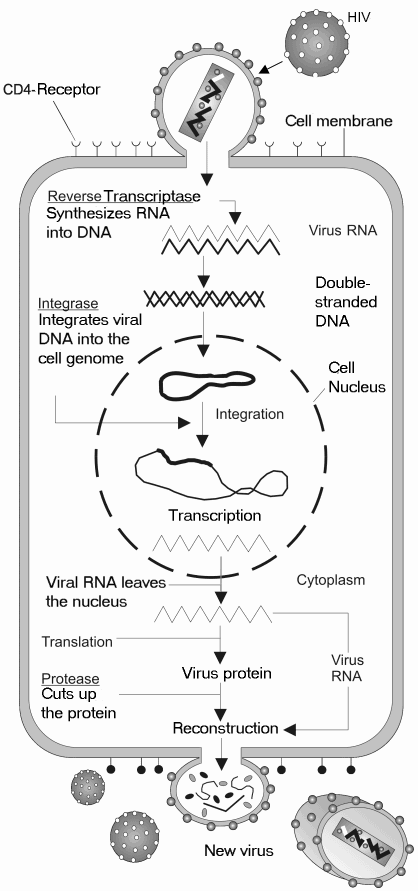
HIV

Tissue tropism develops in the following stages:

- Virus with GPX enters body (where GP - glycoprotein and X is the numeric value given to the GP)
- Viral cell "targets" cell with a GPX receptors
- Viral cell fuses with the host cell and inserts its contents into the host cell
- Reverse transcription occurs
- Viral DNA is incorporated with host DNA via viral enzyme
- Production of RNA and viral protein
- Viral particle is assembled
- Viral particle buds out of the cell, taking a chunk of the cell membrane with it and acquiring a new tissue with all the receptors it needs to continue tissue tropism

Example: HIV has a gp120, which is precisely what the CD4 marker is on the surface of the macrophages and T cells. Thus HIV can enter T cells and macrophages.

== See also ==
- Endothelial cell tropism
- Host tropism
