= Initiative for Medicines, Access, and Knowledge =

Nonprofit organization

- Abbreviation: I-MAK
- Headquarters: United States
- Executive directors: Priti Krishtel and Tahir Amin
- Website: www.i-mak.org

The Initiative for Medicines, Access, and Knowledge, known as I-MAK, is a U.S.-based global 501(c)(3) organization that advocates in the public interest for affordable access to medicines, and a medicines system that is more inclusive of patients and the public.

I-MAK's work has been featured in national and international media outlets, including The New York Times, The Wall Street Journal, The Financial Times, Fox Business, Bloomberg, the Washington Post, Forbes, PBS, Salon, and STAT News.

== Organization ==
I-MAK is a team of lawyers, scientists, and health policy and market dynamics experts who advocate for affordable medications, and prioritize public good over private interests in the medicines system.

I-MAK was founded in 2006 by lawyers Priti Krishtel, experienced in the global access to medicines movement, and Tahir Amin, experienced in intellectual property law. I-MAK has been supported by individuals and organizations aiming to lower the cost of prescription drugs, increase access to medicines, and make systems more inclusive and equitable, including the Ford Foundation, the Laura and John Arnold Foundation, Médecins Sans Frontières/Doctors Without Borders, the Commonwealth Fund, Open Society Foundation, Kaiser Permanente, Echoing Green, the Calamus Foundation DE, the Mont Fund, the Palayam Foundation, Ashoka Foundation, and the Economic Security Project.

== Past activities ==
In the initial days, I-MAK partnered with humanitarian and community-led organizations to launch legal challenges to hepatitis C and HIV drugs in several countries, and successfully filed challenges against pharmaceutical patents that were determined to be unmerited. During this time, I-MAK worked alongside Nobel Peace Prize recipient Médecins Sans, Frontières/Doctors Without Borders, and patient networks to file patent challenges on behalf of low-income patients to ensure they received access to lifesaving medicines.

I-MAK's work has decreased the cost of drugs and increased access to medicines for millions of patients. By 2019, I-MAK had worked on patent law for 33 treatments for 16 diseases, including cancer, HIV, hepatitis C, and diabetes. I-MAK has served in advisory capacities to patient groups, the European Patent Office, UNITAID, the Clinton Foundation, Médecins Sans Frontières/Doctors Without Borders, Gavi the Vaccine Alliance, and the World Health Organization.

== Current activities ==
In 2022, I-MAK launched a publicly accessible database showing drug patent data information on the top selling drugs in the U.S. The database was used by the New York Times in a 2023 investigation into AbbVie's patenting strategies on Humira.

As of October 2022, I-MAK provides research, education, and policy solutions about the medicines system – the system encompassing drug development to drug access – through a process that involves various affected stakeholders called Participatory Changemaking.

In 2021, I-MAK called on the U.S administration and federal agencies to take action to promote competition and advance equity across government and update the patent system in the public's interest. Citing I-MAK's research and attention to the issue, in December 2021, the United States House Committee on Oversight and Reform released an investigation on drug pricing, finding that pharmaceutical companies engage in abusive patenting practices to extend their monopolies in the United States.

In 2022, the New York Times Editorial Board cited I-MAK's publications supporting patent system reform and called on Congress and the United States Patent and Trademark Office Director Kathi Vidal to "modernize and fortify" the patent system.

During the COVID-19 pandemic, I-MAK has been a vocal proponent for more equitable distribution of vaccines and treatments and racial equity in vaccine rollout. I-MAK joined global health advocates in calling for a waiver to the World Trade Organization's TRIPS agreement so that intellectual property did not inhibit manufacturing and access to COVID-19 technologies, emphasizing the amount of public funding that contributed to vaccine and treatment development.
