= Amphotropism =

Ability of a pathogen/parasite to infect multiple species

Amphotropism or amphotropic indicates that a pathogen or parasite like a virus or a bacterium has a wide host range and can infect more than one species or cell culture line. The range is often of a mammalian spread. Amphotropism can be most effectively described in comparison to ecotropic and pantropic pathogens.

== Distinctions and Functionality ==
Amphotropic pathogens are able to affect a relatively wide range of species by having their envelope glycoproteins attack receptors that, due to evolutionary conservation, are structurally similar across species. By exploiting these similarities they are able to extend their range beyond typical ecotropic pathogens, which are only able to identify and attack a specific receptor. However, their range is not as wide as pantropic pathogens, which aren’t reliant on structural similarities to bind.

== Amphotropic Pathogen Examples ==
- Amphotropic Murine Leukemia Virus
- Coxiella burnetii
- Chlamydia

== See also ==
- Tropism, a list of tropisms
- Ecotropism, indicating a narrow host range
