= Motolimod =

Chemical compound

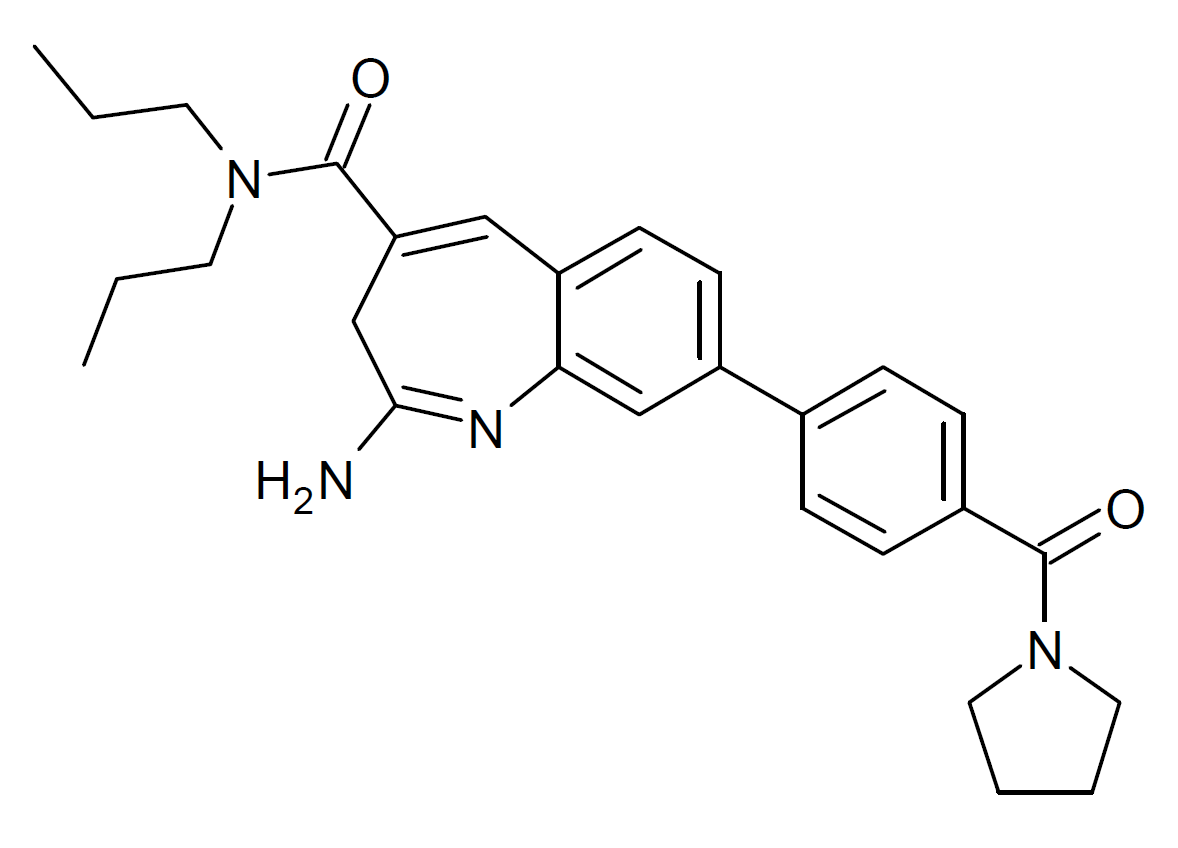

Identifiers
- IUPAC name: 2-amino-N,N-dipropyl-8-[4-(pyrrolidine-1-carbonyl)phenyl]-3H-1-benzazepine-4-carboxamide
- CAS Number: 926927-61-9
- PubChem CID: 16049404
- DrugBank: DB12303
- ChemSpider: 13177800
- UNII: WP6PY72ZH3
- KEGG: D10716
- ChEMBL: ChEMBL3301618
- CompTox Dashboard (EPA): DTXSID10239107

Chemical and physical data
- Formula: C_{28}H_{34}N_{4}O_{2}
- Molar mass: 458.606 g·mol^{−1}
- 3D model (JSmol): Interactive image
- SMILES: CCCN(CCC)C(=O)C1=CC2=C(C=C(C=C2)C3=CC=C(C=C3)C(=O)N4CCCC4)N=C(C1)N
- InChI: InChI=1S/C28H34N4O2/c1-3-13-31(14-4-2)28(34)24-17-23-12-11-22(18-25(23)30-26(29)19-24)20-7-9-21(10-8-20)27(33)32-15-5-6-16-32/h7-12,17-18H,3-6,13-16,19H2,1-2H3,(H2,29,30); Key:QSPOQCXMGPDIHI-UHFFFAOYSA-N

Motolimod (VTX-2337) is a drug which acts as a potent and selective agonist of toll-like receptor 8 (TLR8), a receptor involved in the regulation of the immune system. It is used to stimulate the immune system, and has potential application as an adjuvant therapy in cancer chemotherapy, although clinical trials have shown only modest benefits. It also worsens neuropathic pain in animal models and has been used to research the potential of targeting TLR8 in some kinds of chronic pain syndromes.

== See also ==
- Imiquimod
- Vesatolimod
