= Lopinavir =

Chemical compound

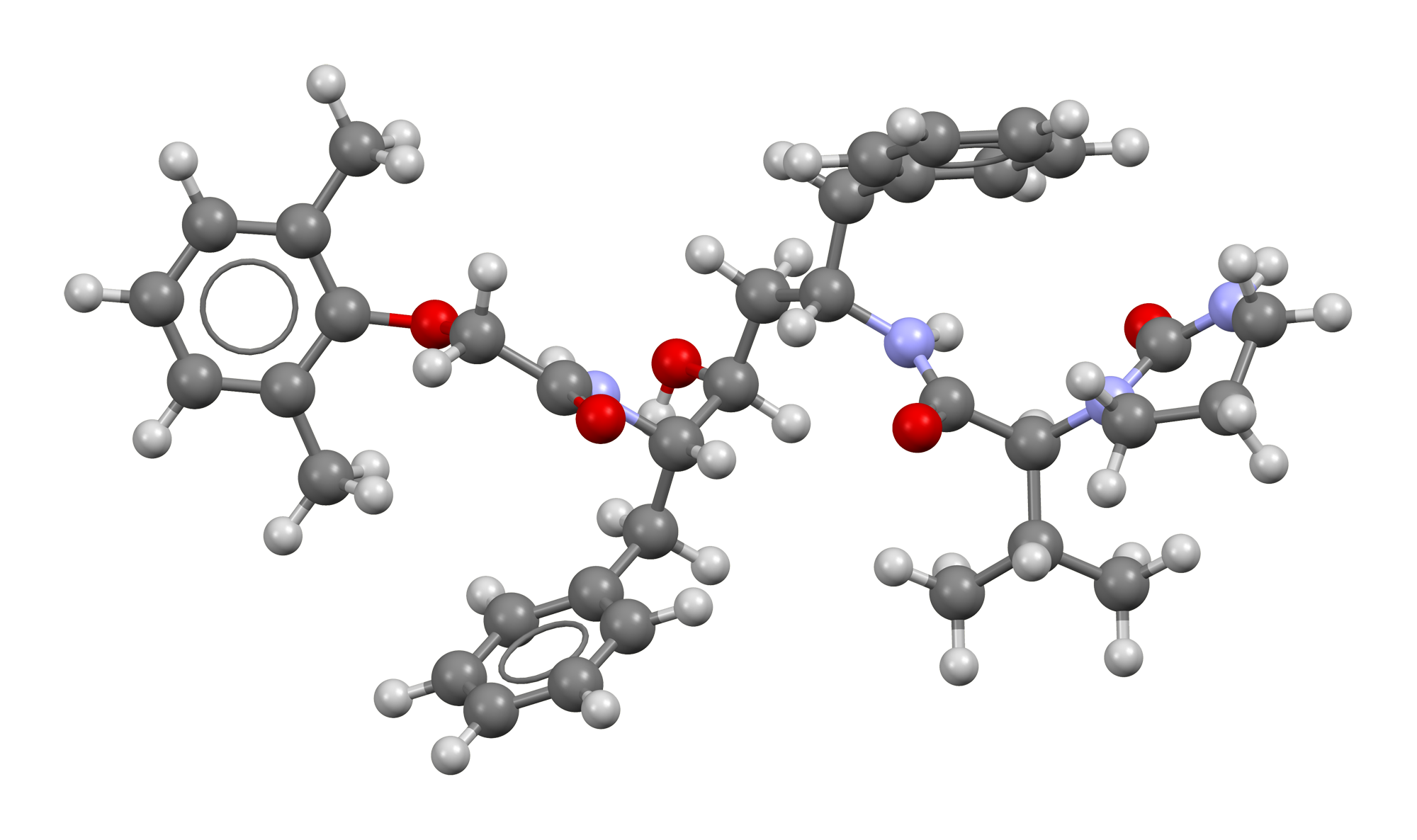

Clinical data
- Pronunciation: /loʊˈpɪnəvɪər/ loh-PIN-ə-veer
- Other names: ABT-378
- AHFS/Drugs.com: International Drug Names
- MedlinePlus: a602015
- License data: US DailyMed: Lopinavir
- Routes of administration: By mouth
- ATC code: J05AR10 (WHO) (with ritonavir)

Legal status
- Legal status: UK: POM (Prescription only); US: ℞-only

Pharmacokinetic data
- Bioavailability: Unknown
- Protein binding: 98-99%
- Metabolism: Liver
- Elimination half-life: 5 to 6 hours
- Excretion: Mostly fecal

Identifiers
- IUPAC name: (2S)-N-[(2S,4S,5S)-5-[2-(2,6-dimethylphenoxy)acetamido]-4-hydroxy-1,6-diphenylhexan-2-yl]-3-methyl-2-(2-oxo-1,3-diazinan-1-yl)butanamide
- CAS Number: 192725-17-0
- PubChem CID: 92727
- DrugBank: DB01601
- ChemSpider: 83706
- UNII: 2494G1JF75
- KEGG: D01425
- ChEMBL: ChEMBL729
- CompTox Dashboard (EPA): DTXSID8046456
- ECHA InfoCard: 100.281.362

Chemical and physical data
- Formula: C_{37}H_{48}N_{4}O_{5}
- Molar mass: 628.814 g·mol^{−1}
- 3D model (JSmol): Interactive image
- SMILES: O=C(N[C@@H](Cc1ccccc1)[C@@H](O)C[C@@H](NC(=O)[C@@H](N2C(=O)NCCC2)C(C)C)Cc3ccccc3)COc4c(cccc4C)C
- InChI: InChI=1S/C37H48N4O5/c1-25(2)34(41-20-12-19-38-37(41)45)36(44)39-30(21-28-15-7-5-8-16-28)23-32(42)31(22-29-17-9-6-10-18-29)40-33(43)24-46-35-26(3)13-11-14-27(35)4/h5-11,13-18,25,30-32,34,42H,12,19-24H2,1-4H3,(H,38,45)(H,39,44)(H,40,43)/t30-,31-,32-,34-/m0/s1; Key:KJHKTHWMRKYKJE-SUGCFTRWSA-N

Lopinavir is an antiretroviral of the protease inhibitor class. It is used against HIV infections as a fixed-dose combination with another protease inhibitor, ritonavir (lopinavir/ritonavir).

It was patented in 1995 and approved for medical use in 2000. Considered now as second-line therapy in the West, it is still prescribed in LMIC, especially among children living with HIV. Lopinavir and ritonavir can be taken as a tablet or an oral solution, a preferred option in children. In the early stages of COVID-19 pandemics, lopinavir was repurposed against the SARS-CoV-2 virus in the hope of disturbing its protease activity.

== Side effects ==
Side effects, interactions, and contraindications have only been evaluated in the drug combination lopinavir/ritonavir. They include nausea, vomiting, and stomach aches.

== Pharmacology ==
Lopinavir is highly bound to plasma proteins (98–99%).

Reports are contradictory regarding lopinavir penetration into the cerebrospinal fluid (CSF). Anecdotal reports state that lopinavir cannot be detected in the CSF; however, a study of paired CSF-plasma samples from 26 patients receiving lopinavir/ritonavir found lopinavir CSF levels above the IC_{50} in 77% of samples.

== Research ==
A 2014 study indicates that lopinavir is effective against the human papilloma virus (HPV). The study used the equivalent of one tablet twice a day applied topically to the cervices of women with high-grade and low-grade precancerous conditions. After three months of treatment, 82.6% of the women who had high-grade disease had normal cervical conditions, confirmed by smears and biopsies. Lopinavir has been shown to impair protein synthesis via AMP-activated protein kinase (AMPK) and eEF2 kinase (eEF2K) activation, a mechanism that is similar to the antiviral effect of protein phosphatase 1 inhibitors.

Lopinavir was found to inhibit MERS-CoV replication in the low-micromolar range in cell cultures. In 2020, lopinavir/ritonavir was found not to work in severe COVID-19. In this trial the medication was started typically around 13 days after the start of symptoms.

== Synthesis ==
A couple of Lopinavir syntheses were reported: Below is one of them.

L-Valine [72-18-4] (1) gives N-Phenoxycarbonyl-L-valine [126147-70-4] ('2). Treatment with 3-Chloropropylamine [14753-26-5] (3) gives (S)-3-methyl-2-(2-oxotetrahydropyrimidine-1-yl)butyric acid [192725-50-1] (4). Halogenation with thionyl chloride leads to (2S)-3-Methyl-2-(2-oxotetrahydropyrimidin-1(2H)-yl)butanoyl chloride [192800-77-4] (5). Reaction with (2S,3S,5S)-5-Amino-2-dibenzylamino-1,6-diphenyl-3-hydroxyhexane, PC9890651 (6) yields (S)-N-[(2S,4S,5S)-5-(Dibenzylamino)-4-hydroxy-1,6-diphenylhexan-2-YL]-3-methyl-2-(2-oxotetrahydropyrimidin-1(2H)-YL)butanamide [192726-04-8] (7). The catalytic hydrogenation removes the protecting group to give (2S)-N-[(2S,4S,5S)-5-amino-4-hydroxy-1,6-diphenylhexan-2-yl]-3-methyl-2-(2-oxo-1,3-diazinan-1-yl)butanamide [192726-05-9] (8). Amide formation with (2,6-Dimethylphenoxy)acetyl Chloride [20143-48-0] (9) completes the synthesis of lopinavir (10).
