= Ecotropism =

Philosophy of human culture

Ecotropism or ecotropic (from eco – hearth and tropic – to turn towards) refers to the philosophy that for human culture to be healthy, it must exist as in an ecological niche and thereby relate appropriately with all the fields of forces of nature, organic and inorganic. The following form of the term has been used since 1990 in the publication of "Toward an Ecotropic Poetry", by John Campion and John Herndon.

Ecotropism can also indicate that a pathogen, like a virus or a bacterium, has a narrow host range and can infect one or a small group of species or cell culture lines.

== Ecotropism in plants ==
In biology and ecology, Ecotropism refers to the way organisms and ecosystems respond to environmental changes, ensuring survival and adaptation in shifting conditions. It is closely related to tropism which is the movement or growth of organisms in respire to external stimuli such as light or gravity. Ecotropism can be observed at multiple levels, from individuals species to entire ecosystems.

Plants exhibit multiple tropic responses that can be characterised under Ecotropism.

1. Phototropism:- Phototropism is the directional growth of organisms in response to light. In plants, this is evident when stems bend toward a light source, a behaviour driven by the hormone auxin, which accumulates on the shaded side of the plant, causing cells to elongate and the plant to lean toward the light. this adaptation maximises photosynthesis by ensuring that leaves receive optimal light exposure.
2. Gravitropism: Gravitropism, also known as geotropism describes and organisms growth response to gravity. roots exhibit positive gravitropism by growing downward into the soil, anchoring the plant and accessing water and nutrients. However, stems display negative gravitropism by growing upward, away from the gravitational pull, to reach sunlight. this coordinated response ensures that plants develop properly regardless of seed orientation.
3. Hydrotropism: Hydrotropism is the growth response of plant roots toward moisture. When soil moisture is unevenly distributed, roots can detect and grow toward areas with higher water content. This mechanism is crucial for plant survival, especially in arid environments, as it allows efficient water uptake.
4. Thigmotropism: Thigmotropism refers to an organism’s growth response to mechanical stimuli or touch. Climbing plants, such as vines, exhibit this behaviour by wrapping around structures for support. This response enables plants to reach sunlight without investing heavily in structural tissues. Additionally, certain carnivorous plants utilise thigmotropism to sense and capture prey.
5. Chemotropism: Chemotropism involves growth or movement in response to chemical stimuli. A notable example is the growth of pollen tubes toward ovules during fertilisation in flowering plants, guided by chemical signals. In microorganisms, chemotropism allows movement toward favourable chemicals or away from harmful substances, aiding in survival and colonisation.

== Ecotropism in Microorganisms ==
Microorganisms, including bacteria and fungi, exhibit ecotropic behaviours that are essential for their survival and ecological roles.

- For instance, bacteria utilise chemotaxis, a form of chemotropism, to navigate toward nutrients or away from toxins.
- Fungi, such as mycorrhizal species, grow toward plant roots in response to chemical signals, establishing symbiotic relationships that enhance nutrient exchange and support plant health.
- Plastic eating bacteria ‘Ideonella sakaiensis’ :- a bacterium that breaks down PET plastics, represents a potential ecological response to plastic pollution.

== Human Influence on Ecotropism ==
Human activities have significantly impacted natural ecotropic responses. Urbanisation and artificial lighting can disrupt phototropic behaviours in plants, leading to altered growth patterns. Soil pollution and excessive use of fertilisers may interfere with chemotropic responses, affecting nutrient uptake and plant development. Understanding these influences is vital for developing sustainable agricultural practices and mitigating negative environmental impacts.

== The Role of Ecotropism in Ecosystems ==
Ecotropism plays a crucial role in maintaining ecological balance. It dictates how organisms interact with their environment and each other, influencing resource acquisition, competition, and adaptation. For example, in dense forests, phototropism drives trees to grow taller to access sunlight, while in water-scarce regions, hydrotropism enables plants to efficiently locate and utilise limited water resources. These adaptive responses contribute to biodiversity and the resilience of ecosystems.

== See also ==
- Tropism, a list of tropisms
- Amphotropism, indicating a wide host range
- (), link to early ecotropic essay and ecotropic concepts
