= Lopinavir/ritonavir =

Combination medication for HIV/AIDS

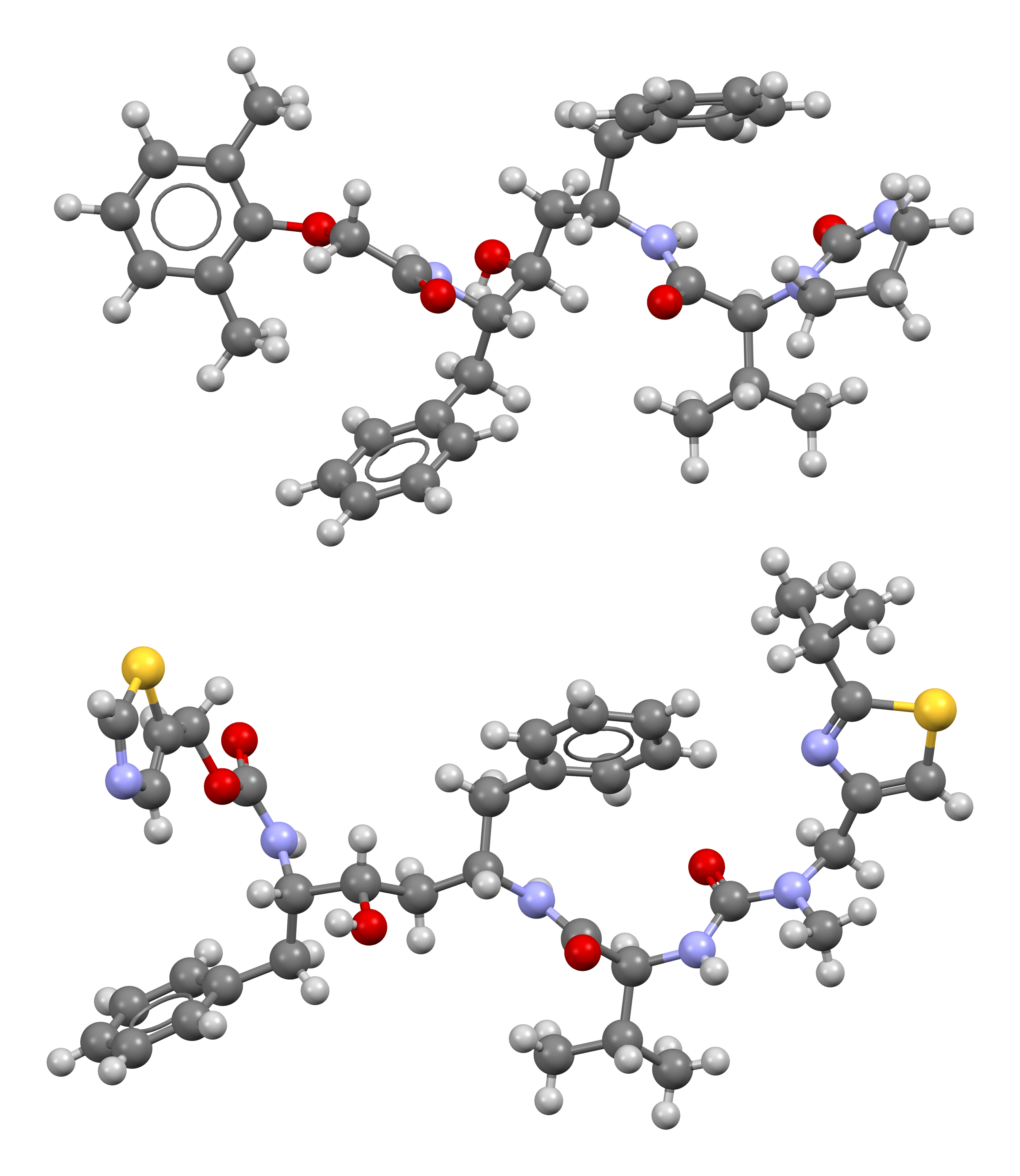

Combination of
- Lopinavir: Protease inhibitor
- Ritonavir: Protease inhibitor (pharmacokinetic booster)

Clinical data
- Trade names: Kaletra, Aluvia
- AHFS/Drugs.com: Monograph
- MedlinePlus: a602015
- License data: US DailyMed: Kaletra
- Pregnancy category: AU: B3
- Routes of administration: By mouth
- ATC code: J05AR10 (WHO)

Legal status
- Legal status: AU: S4 (Prescription only); CA: ℞-only; UK: POM (Prescription only); US: ℞-only; EU: Rx-only

Identifiers
- CAS Number: 369372-47-4
- PubChem CID: 11979606
- KEGG: D02498
- NIAID ChemDB: 003688
- CompTox Dashboard (EPA): DTXSID30190428

Lopinavir/ritonavir (LPV/r), sold under the brand name Kaletra among others, is a fixed-dose combination antiretroviral medication for the treatment and prevention of HIV/AIDS. It combines lopinavir with a low dose of ritonavir. It is generally recommended for use with other antiretrovirals. It may be used for prevention after a needlestick injury or other potential exposure. It is taken by mouth as a tablet, capsule, or solution.

Common side effects include diarrhea, vomiting, feeling tired, headaches, and muscle pains. Severe side effects may include pancreatitis, liver problems, and high blood sugar. It is commonly used in pregnancy and it appears to be safe. Both medications are HIV protease inhibitors. Ritonavir functions by slowing down the breakdown of lopinavir.

Lopinavir/ritonavir as a combination medication was approved for use in the United States in 2000. It is on the World Health Organization's List of Essential Medicines.

== Medical uses ==
Lopinavir/ritonavir was once a preferred combination for HIV first-line therapy in the United States. But due to its higher pill burden compared to other protease inhibitor-based regimens and increased gastrointestinal intolerance, it is no longer recommended to treatment-naive patients.

== Adverse effects ==
The most common adverse effects observed with lopinavir/ritonavir are diarrhea and nausea. In key clinical trials, moderate or severe diarrhea occurred in up to 27% of patients, and moderate/severe nausea in up to 16%. Other common adverse effects include abdominal pain, asthenia, headache, vomiting and, particularly in children, rash.

Lopinavir/ritonavir is anticipated to have varying degrees of interaction with other medications that are also CYP3A and/or P-gp substrates.

People with a structural heart disease, preexisting conduction system abnormalities, ischaemic heart disease, or cardiomyopathies should use lopinavir/ritonavir with caution.

In March 2011, the US Food and Drug Administration (FDA) notified healthcare professionals of serious health problems that have been reported in premature babies receiving lopinavir/ritonavir oral solution, probably because of its propylene glycol content. They recommend the use should be avoided in premature babies.

== History ==
Abbott Laboratories (now, via spinoff, Abbvie) was one of the earliest users of the Advanced Photon Source (APS), a national synchrotron-radiation light source at Argonne National Laboratory. One of the early research projects undertaken at the APS focused on proteins from the human immunodeficiency virus (HIV). Using the APS beam line for X-ray crystallography, researchers determined viral protein structures that allowed them to determine their approach to the development of HIV protease inhibitors, a key enzyme target that processes HIV polyproteins after infection, the function of which allows the lifecycle of the virus to proceed. As a result of this structure-based drug design approach using the Argonne APS, Abbott was able to develop new products that inhibit the protease, and therefore stop virus replication.

Lopinavir was developed by Abbott in an attempt to improve upon the company's earlier protease inhibitor, ritonavir, specifically with regard to its serum protein-binding properties (reducing the interference by serum on protease enzyme inhibition) and its HIV resistance profile (reducing the ability of virus to evolve resistance to the drug). Administered alone, lopinavir has insufficient bioavailability; however, like several HIV protease inhibitors, its blood levels are greatly increased by low doses of ritonavir, a potent inhibitor of intestinal and hepatic cytochrome P450 3A4, which would otherwise reduce drug levels through catabolism.

Lopinavir/ritonavir was approved by the US Food and Drug Administration (FDA) in September 2000, and in the European Union in March 2001.

In March 2020, during the COVID-19 pandemic, the Israeli government announced that it would force AbbVie to license its patents for lopinavir/ritonavir. In response, AbbVie announced that it would cease enforcing its patents on the drug entirely.

== Society and culture ==
=== Cost ===
As a result of high prices and the spread of HIV infection, the government of Thailand issued a compulsory license in January 2007, to produce and/or import generic versions of lopinavir and ritonavir. In response, Abbott Laboratories withdrew its registration for lopinavir and seven of their other new drugs in Thailand, citing the Thai government's lack of respect for patents. Abbott's attitude has been denounced by several NGOs worldwide, including a netstrike initiated by Act Up-Paris and a public call to boycott all of Abbott's medicines by the French NGO AIDES.

=== Available forms ===
Heat-stable pellets that can be taken by mouth have been developed for children.

== Research ==
While data for SARS-CoV-1 looked promising, the benefit in COVID-19 is unclear as of March 2020. In 2020, a non-blinded, randomized trial found lopinavir/ritonavir was not useful to treat severe COVID-19. In this trial the medication was started typically around 13 days after the start of symptoms.
