= Toll-like receptor 8 =

Protein found in humans

TLR8

Identifiers
- Aliases: TLR8, CD288, toll like receptor 8, hIMD98
- External IDs: OMIM: 300366; MGI: 2176887; GeneCards: TLR8
Available structures
PDB	Ortholog search: PDBe RCSB
PDB	List of PDB id codes 3W3G, 3W3J, 3W3K, 3W3L, 3W3M, 3W3N, 3WN4, 4QBZ, 4QC0, 4R07, 4R08, 4R09, 4R0A, 4R6A, 5AWB, 5AWD, 5HDH, 5AWA

Gene location (Human)
Chr.	X chromosome (human)
Band	Xp22.2	Start	12,906,620 bp
Band	Xp22.2	End	12,923,169 bp

Gene location (Mouse)
Chr.	X chromosome (mouse)
Band	X|X F5	Start	166,025,692 bp
Band	X|X F5	End	166,047,325 bp
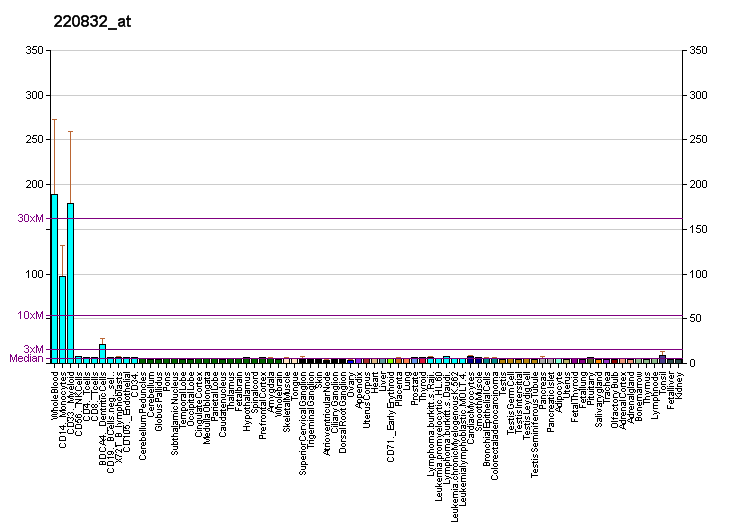
RNA expression pattern
Bgee	Human / Mouse (ortholog); Top expressed in: monocyte; blood; granulocyte; visceral pleura; trabecular bone; bone marrow; spleen; appendix; parietal pleura; lower lobe of lung / Top expressed in: granulocyte; zygote; embryo; stroma of bone marrow; secondary oocyte; calvaria; esophagus; muscle of thigh; spleen; blastocyst; More reference expression data
BioGPS	More reference expression data
Gene ontology
Molecular function	DNA binding; identical protein binding; RNA binding; double-stranded RNA binding; single-stranded RNA binding; transmembrane signaling receptor activity; signaling receptor activity; pattern recognition receptor activity
Cellular component	endoplasmic reticulum membrane; membrane; Golgi membrane; endolysosome membrane; endosome membrane; integral component of plasma membrane; external side of plasma membrane; integral component of membrane; plasma membrane
Biological process	regulation of protein phosphorylation; immune system process; response to virus; MyD88-dependent toll-like receptor signaling pathway; microglial cell activation; cellular response to mechanical stimulus; defense response to virus; immunoglobulin mediated immune response; positive regulation of innate immune response; toll-like receptor 9 signaling pathway; I-kappaB kinase/NF-kappaB signaling; signal transduction; innate immune response; inflammatory response; toll-like receptor signaling pathway; toll-like receptor 8 signaling pathway; immune response; positive regulation of interleukin-6 production
Sources:Amigo / QuickGO
Orthologs
Databases	NCBI: entry; OMA: entry
Species	Human	Mouse
Entrez	51311	170744
Ensembl	ENSG00000101916	ENSMUSG00000040522
UniProt	Q9NR97	P58682
RefSeq (mRNA)	NM_016610; NM_138636	NM_133212; NM_001313760; NM_001313761
RefSeq (protein)	NP_057694; NP_619542	NP_001300689; NP_001300690; NP_573475
Location (UCSC)	Chr X: 12.91 – 12.92 Mb	Chr X: 166.03 – 166.05 Mb
PubMed search
- Wikidata
View/Edit Human	View/Edit Mouse

Toll-like receptor 8 is a protein that in humans is encoded by the TLR8 gene. TLR8 has also been designated as CD288 (cluster of differentiation 288). It is a member of the toll-like receptor (TLR) family.

== Function ==
TLR8 seems to function differently in humans and mice. Until recently, TLR8 was believed to be nonfunctional in mice, but it seems to counteract TLR7 activity

The TLR family plays a fundamental role in pathogen recognition and activation of innate immunity. TLRs are highly conserved from Drosophila to humans and share structural and functional similarities. They recognize pathogen-associated molecular patterns (PAMPs) that are expressed on infectious agents, and mediate the production of cytokines necessary for the development of effective immunity. The various TLRs exhibit different patterns of expression. This gene is predominantly expressed in lung and peripheral blood leukocytes, and lies in close proximity to another family member, TLR7, on chromosome X. Recent research has also shown the expression of TLR8 in hippocampal interneurons, with yet unknown function.

TLR8 can recognize GU-rich single-stranded RNA. However, the presence of GU-rich sequences in the single-stranded RNA is not sufficient to stimulate TLR8. TLR8 recognizes G-rich oligonucleotides. TLR8 is activated by ssRNA and forms a dimer complex when uridine released from the degraded ssRNA binds at one active site in between the dimers and a short oligonucleotide binds to another active site on the surface of the TLR8 structure.

TLR8 is an endosomal receptor that recognizes single stranded RNA (ssRNA), and can recognize ssRNA viruses such as Influenza, Sendai, and Coxsackie B viruses. TLR8 binding to the viral RNA recruits the myeloid differentiation primary response protein 88 (MyD88) and leads to activation of the transcription factor NF-κB and an antiviral response that leads to proinflammatory cytokine synthesis. TLR8 recognizes single-stranded RNA of viruses such as HIV and HCV. TLR8 is also involved in the activation of dendritic cells to produce inflammatory factors to help regulate tumor growth, so TLR8 is often used as a target in the research for therapies in treating cancers including ovarian cancer and lymphomas.

== Clinical significance ==
Genetic variants in TLR8 has recently been linked to susceptibility to pulmonary tuberculosis.

=== As a drug target ===
- TLR8 agonists (e.g. VTX-2337) have undergone clinical trials as immune stimulants in combination therapy for some cancers.
- TLR8 antagonists (e.g. CU-CPT9a) may have therapeutic applications against autoimmune disorders.
