= Toll-like receptor 7 =

Protein found in humans

TLR7

Identifiers
- Aliases: TLR7, TLR7-like, toll like receptor 7, IMD74, SLEB17
- External IDs: OMIM: 300365; MGI: 2176882; GeneCards: TLR7

Gene location (Human)
Chr.	X chromosome (human)
Band	Xp22.2	Start	12,867,072 bp
Band	Xp22.2	End	12,890,361 bp

Gene location (Mouse)
Chr.	X chromosome (mouse)
Band	X|X F5	Start	166,087,925 bp
Band	X|X F5	End	166,113,554 bp
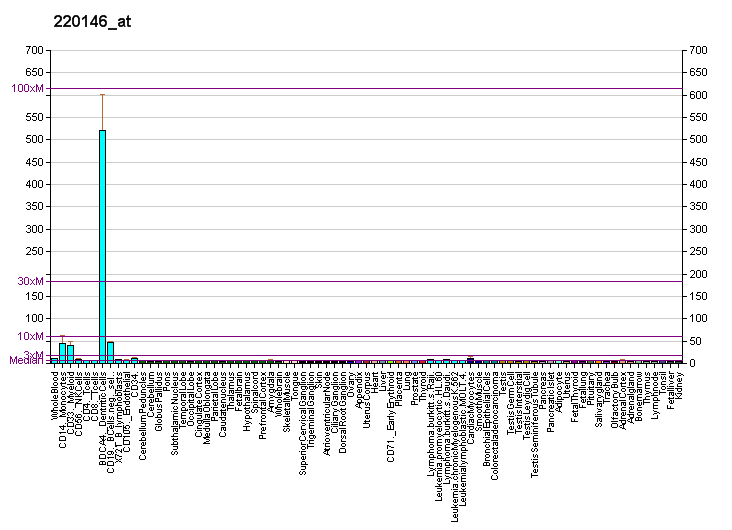
RNA expression pattern
Bgee	Human / Mouse (ortholog); Top expressed in: monocyte; granulocyte; testicle; lymph node; appendix; gallbladder; parietal pleura; rectum; right coronary artery; placenta / Top expressed in: stroma of bone marrow; granulocyte; spleen; calvaria; blood; embryo; embryo; mesenteric lymph nodes; subcutaneous adipose tissue; thymus; More reference expression data
BioGPS	More reference expression data
Gene ontology
Molecular function	transmembrane signaling receptor activity; double-stranded RNA binding; siRNA binding; single-stranded RNA binding; pattern recognition receptor activity
Cellular component	integral component of membrane; Golgi membrane; cytoplasmic vesicle; early phagosome; endosome; receptor complex; phagocytic vesicle; membrane; lysosome; endoplasmic reticulum; plasma membrane; endolysosome membrane; cytoplasm; endosome membrane; endoplasmic reticulum membrane
Biological process	I-kappaB phosphorylation; immune system process; positive regulation of inflammatory response; toll-like receptor 9 signaling pathway; positive regulation of interleukin-8 production; toll-like receptor signaling pathway; regulation of protein phosphorylation; defense response to virus; cellular response to mechanical stimulus; microglial cell activation; positive regulation of interleukin-6 production; MyD88-dependent toll-like receptor signaling pathway; signal transduction; positive regulation of chemokine production; immune response; toll-like receptor 7 signaling pathway; innate immune response; inflammatory response; positive regulation of NIK/NF-kappaB signaling; I-kappaB kinase/NF-kappaB signaling
Sources:Amigo / QuickGO
Orthologs
Databases	NCBI: entry; OMA: entry
Species	Human	Mouse
Entrez	51284	170743
Ensembl	ENSG00000196664	ENSMUSG00000044583
UniProt	Q9NYK1	P58681
RefSeq (mRNA)	NM_016562	NM_133211; NM_001290755; NM_001290756; NM_001290757; NM_001290758
RefSeq (protein)	NP_057646	NP_001277684; NP_001277685; NP_001277686; NP_001277687; NP_573474
Location (UCSC)	Chr X: 12.87 – 12.89 Mb	Chr X: 166.09 – 166.11 Mb
PubMed search
- Wikidata
View/Edit Human	View/Edit Mouse

Toll-like receptor 7, also known as TLR7, is a protein that in humans is encoded by the TLR7 gene. Orthologs are found in mammals and birds. It is a member of the toll-like receptor (TLR) family and detects single stranded RNA.

== Function ==
The TLR family plays an important role in pathogen recognition and activation of innate immunity. TLRs are highly conserved from Drosophila to humans and share structural and functional similarities. They recognize pathogen-associated molecular patterns (PAMPs) that are expressed on infectious agents, and mediate the production of cytokines necessary for the development of effective immunity. The various TLRs exhibit different patterns of expression. This gene is predominantly expressed in lung, placenta, and spleen, and lies in close proximity to another family member, TLR8, on the human X chromosome.

TLR7 recognizes single-stranded RNA in endosomes, which is a common feature of viral genomes which are internalized by macrophages and dendritic cells. TLR7 recognizes single-stranded RNA of viruses such as HIV and hepatitis C virus. TLR7 can recognize GU-rich single-stranded RNA. However, the presence of GU-rich sequences in the single-stranded RNA is not sufficient to stimulate TLR7.

== Clinical significance ==
TLR7 has been shown to play a significant role in the pathogenesis of autoimmune disorders (e.g. systemic lupus erythematous) as well as in the regulation of antiviral immunity (e.g. COVID-19). Although not yet fully elucidated, using an unbiased genome-scale screen with short hairpin RNA (shRNA), it has been demonstrated that the receptor TREML4 acts as an essential positive regulator of TLR7 signaling. In TREML4 -/- mice macrophages that are hyporesponsive to TLR7 agonists, macrophages fail to produce type I interferons due to impaired phosphorylation of the transcription factor STAT1 by the mitogen-activated protein kinase p38 and decreased recruitment of the adaptor MYD88 to TLR7. TREML4 deficiency reduced the production of inflammatory cytokines and autoantibodies in MRL/lpr mice, suggesting that TLR7 is a vital component of antiviral immunity and a predecessor factor in the pathogenesis of rheumatic diseases such as systemic lupus erythematosus (SLE). A TLR7 agonist, imiquimod (Aldara), has been approved for topical use in treating warts caused by papillomavirus and for actinic keratosis. Due to their ability to induce robust production of anti-cancer cytokines such as interleukin-12, TLR7 agonists have also been investigated for cancer immunotherapy and as vaccine adjuvants. Recent examples include TMX-202 delivery via liposomal formulation, as well as the delivery of resiquimod via nanoparticles formed from beta-cyclodextrin.

=== Loss-of-Function TLR7 Variants ===
Loss-of-function variants in TLR7 diminish the innate immune response against viral infection by primarily affecting interferon production. In July 2020, it was discovered that TLR7 deficiency predisposes young, previously healthy, male patients to severe infection with SARS-CoV-2. More recently in November 2023, a novel TLR7 hemizygous loss-of-function variant was identified in a pediatric patient with severe neurological deterioration following COVID-19 infection. These findings suggest that TLR7 not only plays a key role in triggering the immune response against COVID-19 but may also mediate the post-infectious sequalae in critically ill patients. Further research is required to fully delineate the mechanisms by which functional impairment of TLR7 influences the disease process and to explore the potential efficacy of targeting this pathway in the treatment of COVID-19.

=== Gain-of-Function TLR7 Variants ===
In contrast, gain-of-function variation in TLR7 disrupts immune tolerance, potentially increasing the risk of autoimmune disorders. In May 2022, unregulated gain-of function TLR7 variants were found to cause systemic lupus erythematous and neuromyelitis optica in humans.

=== Agonists ===
- AXC-715
- Imiquimod
- TMX-202
