= Damage-associated molecular pattern =

Type of molecules within cells

Damage-associated molecular patterns (DAMPs) are molecules within cells that are a component of the innate immune response released from damaged or dying cells due to trauma or an infection by a pathogen. They are also known as danger signals, and alarmins because they serve as warning signs to alert the organism to any damage or infection to its cells. DAMPs are endogenous danger signals that are discharged to the extracellular space in response to damage to the cell from mechanical trauma or a pathogen. Once a DAMP is released from the cell, it promotes a noninfectious inflammatory response by binding to a pattern recognition receptor (PRR). Inflammation is a key aspect of the innate immune response; it is used to help mitigate future damage to the organism by removing harmful invaders from the affected area and start the healing process. As an example, the cytokine IL-1α is a DAMP that originates within the nucleus of the cell which, once released to the extracellular space, binds to the PRR IL-1R, which in turn initiates an inflammatory response to the trauma or pathogen that initiated the release of IL-1α. In contrast to the noninfectious inflammatory response produced by DAMPs, pathogen-associated molecular patterns (PAMPs) initiate and perpetuate the infectious pathogen-induced inflammatory response. Many DAMPs are nuclear or cytosolic proteins with defined intracellular function that are released outside the cell following tissue injury. This displacement from the intracellular space to the extracellular space moves the DAMPs from a reducing to an oxidizing environment, causing their functional denaturation, resulting in their loss of function. Outside of the aforementioned nuclear and cytosolic DAMPs, there are other DAMPs originated from different sources, such as mitochondria, granules, the extracellular matrix, the endoplasmic reticulum, and the plasma membrane.

== Overview ==
DAMPs and their receptors are characterized as:

Table 1. List of DAMPs, their origins, and their receptors
Origin		Major DAMPs	Receptors
Extracellular matrix		Biglycan	TLR2, TLR4, NLRP3
		Decorin	TLR2, TLR4
		Versican	TLR2, TLR6, CD14
		LMW hyaluronan	TLR2, TLR4, NLRP3
		Heparan sulfate	TLR4
		Fibronectin (EDA domain)	TLR4
		Fibrinogen	TLR4
		Tenascin C	TLR4
Intracellular compartments	Cytosol	Uric Acid	NLRP3, P2X7
		S100 proteins	TLR2, TLR4, RAGE
		Heat-shock proteins	TLR2, TLR4, CD91
		ATP	P2X7, P2Y2
		F-actin	DNGR-1
		Cyclophilin A	CD147
		Aβ	TLR2, NLRP1, NLRP3, CD36, RAGE
	Nuclear	Histones	TLR2, TLR4
		HMGB1	TLR2, TLR4, RAGE
		HMGN1	TLR4
		IL-1α	IL-1R
		IL-33	ST2
		SAP130	Mincle
		DNA	TLR9, AIM2
		RNA	TLR3, TLR7, TLR8, RIG-I, MDA5
	Mitochondria	mtDNA	TLR9
		TFAM	RAGE
		Formyl peptide	FPR1
		mROS	NLRP3
	Endoplasmic reticulum	Calreticulin	CD91
	Granule	Defensins	TLR4
		Cathelicidin (LL37)	P2X7, FPR2
		Eosinophil-derived neurotoxin	TLR2
		Granulysin	TLR4
	Plasma membrane	Syndecans	TLR4
		Glypicans	TLR4

== History ==
Two papers appearing in 1994 anticipated the deeper understanding of innate immune reactivity, pointing towards the subsequent understanding of the nature of the adaptive immune response. The first came from transplant surgeons who conducted a prospective randomized, double-blind, placebo-controlled trial. Administration of recombinant human superoxide dismutase (rh-SOD) in recipients of cadaveric renal allografts demonstrated prolonged patient and graft survival with improvement in both acute and chronic rejection events. They speculated that the effect was related to SOD's antioxidant action on the initial ischemia/reperfusion injury of the renal allograft, thereby reducing the immunogenicity of the allograft. Thus, free radical-mediated reperfusion injury was seen to contribute to the process of innate and subsequent adaptive immune responses.

The second study suggested the possibility that the immune system detected "danger", through a series of what is now called damage-associated molecular pattern molecules (DAMPs), working in concert with both positive and negative signals derived from other tissues. Thus, these papers anticipated the modern sense of the role of DAMPs and redox, important, apparently, for both plant and animal resistance to pathogens and the response to cellular injury or damage. Although many immunologists had earlier noted that various "danger signals" could initiate innate immune responses, the "DAMP" was first described by Seong and Matzinger in 2004.

== Examples ==
DAMPs vary greatly depending on the type of cell (epithelial or mesenchymal) and injured tissue, but they all share the common feature of stimulating an innate immune response within an organism.

- Protein DAMPs include intracellular proteins, such as heat-shock proteins or HMGB1, and materials derived from the extracellular matrix that are generated following tissue injury, such as hyaluronan fragments.
- Non-protein DAMPs include ATP, uric acid, heparin sulfate and DNA.

=== In humans ===
==== Protein DAMPs ====
1. High-mobility group box 1: HMGB1, a member of the HMG protein family, is a prototypical chromatin-associated LSP (leaderless secreted protein), secreted by hematopoietic cells through a lysosome-mediated pathway. HMGB1 is a major mediator of endotoxin shock and is recognized as a DAMP by certain immune cells, triggering an inflammatory response. It is known to induce inflammation by activating NF-κB pathway by binding to TLR, TLR4, TLR9, and RAGE (receptor for advanced glycation end products). HMGB1 can also induce dendritic cell maturation via upregulation of CD80, CD83, CD86 and CD11c, and the production of other pro-inflammatory cytokines in myeloid cells (IL-1, TNF-a, IL-6, IL-8), and it can lead to increased expression of cell adhesion molecules (ICAM-1, VCAM-1) on endothelial cells.
1. DNA and RNA: The presence of DNA anywhere other than the nucleus or mitochondria is perceived as a DAMP and triggers responses mediated by TLR9 and DAI that drive cellular activation and immunoreactivity. Some tissues, such as the gut, are inhibited by DNA in their immune response because the gut is filled with trillions of microbiota, which help break down food and regulate the immune system. Without being inhibited by DNA, the gut would detect these microbiota as invading pathogens, and initiate an inflammatory response, which would be detrimental for the organism's health because while the microbiota may be foreign molecules inside the host, they are crucial in promoting host health. Similarly, damaged RNAs released from UVB-exposed keratinocytes activate TLR3 on intact keratinocytes. TLR3 activation stimulates TNF-alpha and IL-6 production, which initiate the cutaneous inflammation associated with sunburn.
1. S100 proteins: S100 is a multigenic family of calcium modulated proteins involved in intracellular and extracellular regulatory activities with a connection to cancer as well as tissue, particularly neuronal, injury. Their main function is the management of calcium storage and shuffling. Although they have various functions, including cell proliferation, differentiation, migration, and energy metabolism, they also act as DAMPs by interacting with their receptors (TLR2, TLR4, RAGE) after they are released from phagocytes.
1. Mono- and polysaccharides: The ability of the immune system to recognize hyaluronan fragments is one example of how DAMPs can be made of sugars.

==== Nonprotein DAMPs ====
- Purine metabolites: Nucleotides (e.g., ATP) and nucleosides (e.g., adenosine) that have reached the extracellular space can also serve as danger signals by signaling through purinergic receptors. ATP and adenosine are released in high concentrations after catastrophic disruption of the cell, as occurs in necrotic cell death. Extracellular ATP triggers mast cell degranulation by signaling through P2X7 receptors. Similarly, adenosine triggers degranulation through P1 receptors. Uric acid is also an endogenous danger signal released by injured cells. Adenosine triphosphate (ATP) and uric acid, which are purine metabolites, activate NLR family, pyrin domain containing (NLRP) 3 inflammasomes to induce IL-1β and IL-18.

=== In plants ===
DAMPs in plants have been found to stimulate a fast immune response, but without the inflammation that characterizes DAMPs in mammals. Just as with mammalian DAMPs, plant DAMPs are cytosolic in nature and are released into the extracellular space following damage to the cell caused by either trauma or pathogen. The major difference in the immune systems between plants and mammals is that plants lack an adaptive immune system, so plants can not determine which pathogens have attacked them before and thus easily mediate an effective immune response to them. To make up for this lack of defense, plants use the pattern-triggered immunity (PTI) and effector-triggered immunity (ETI) pathways to combat trauma and pathogens. PTI is the first line of defense in plants and is triggered by PAMPs to initiate signaling throughout the plant that damage has occurred to a cell. Along with the PTI, DAMPs are also released in response to this damage, but as mentioned earlier they do not initiate an inflammatory response like their mammalian counterparts. The main role of DAMPs in plants is to act as mobile signals to initiate wounding responses and to promote damage repair. A large overlap occurs between the PTI pathway and DAMPs in plants, and the plant DAMPs effectively operate as PTI amplifiers. The ETI always occurs after the PTI pathway and DAMP release, and is a last resort response to the pathogen or trauma that ultimately results in programmed cell death. The PTI- and ETI-signaling pathways are used in conjunction with DAMPs to rapidly signal the rest of the plant to activate its innate immune response and fight off the invading pathogen or mediate the healing process from damage caused by trauma.

Plant DAMPs and their receptors are characterized as:

Table 2. List of plant DAMPs, their structures, sources, receptors, and observed plant species
Category	DAMP	Molecular structure or epitope	Source or precursor	Receptor or signaling regulator	Species
Epidermis cuticle	Cutin monomers	C16 and C18 hydroxy and epoxy fatty acids	Epidermis cuticle	Unknown	Arabidopsis thaliana, Solanum lycopersicum
Cell wall polysaccharide fragments or degrading products	OGs	Polymers of 10–15 α-1-4-linked GalAs	Cell wall pectin	WAK1 (A. thaliana)	A. thaliana, G. max, N. tabacum
Cell wall polysaccharide fragments or degrading products	Cellooligomers	Polymers of 2–7 β-1,4-linked glucoses	Cell wall cellulose	Unknown	A. thaliana
Cell wall polysaccharide fragments or degrading products	Xyloglucan oligosaccharides	Polymers of β-1,4-linked glucose with xylose, galactose, and fructose side chains	Cell-wall hemicellulose	Unknown	A. thaliana, Vitis vinifera
Cell wall polysaccharide fragments or degrading products	Methanol	Methanol	Cell wall pectin	Unknown	A. thaliana, Nicotiana tabacum
Apoplastic peptides and proteins	CAPE1	11-aa peptide	Apoplastic PR1	Unknown	A. thaliana, S. lycopersicum
Apoplastic peptides and proteins	GmSUBPEP	12-aa peptide	Apoplastic subtilase	Unknown	Glycine max
Apoplastic peptides and proteins	GRIp	11-aa peptide	Cytosolic GRI	PRK5	A. thaliana
Apoplastic peptides and proteins	Systemin	18-aa peptide (S. lycopersicum)	Cytosolic prosystemin	SYR1/2 (S. lycopersicum)	Some Solanaceae species
Apoplastic peptides and proteins	HypSys	15-, 18-, or 20-aa peptides	Apoplastic or cytoplasmic preproHypSys	Unknown	Some Solanaceae species
Apoplastic peptides and proteins	Peps	23~36-aa peptides (A. thaliana)	Cytosolic and vacuolar PROPEPs	PEPR1/2 (A. thaliana)	A. thaliana, Zea mays, S. lycopersicum, Oryza sativa
Apoplastic peptides and proteins	PIP1/2	11-aa peptides	Apoplastic preproPIP1/2	RLK7	A. thaliana
Apoplastic peptides and proteins	GmPep914/890	8-aa peptide	Apoplastic or cytoplasmic GmproPep914/890	Unknown	G. max
Apoplastic peptides and proteins	Zip1	17-aa peptide	Apoplastic PROZIP1	Unknown	Z. mays
Apoplastic peptides and proteins	IDL6p	11-aa peptide	Apoplastic or cytoplasmic IDL6 precursors	HEA/HSL2	A. thaliana
Apoplastic peptides and proteins	RALFs	~50-aa cysteine-rich peptides	Apoplastic or cytoplasmic RALF precursors	FER (A. thaliana)	A. thaliana, N. tabacum, S. lycopersicum
Apoplastic peptides and proteins	PSKs	5-aa peptides	Apoplastic or cytoplasmic PSK precursors	PSKR1/2 (A. thaliana)	A. thaliana, S. lycopersicum
Apoplastic peptides and proteins	HMGB3	HMGB3 protein	Cytosolic and nuclear HMGB3	Unknown	A. thaliana
Apoplastic peptides and proteins	Inceptin	11-aa peptide	Chloroplastic ATP synthase γ-subunit	INR	Vigna unguiculata
Extracellular nucleotides	eATP	ATP	Cytosolic ATP	DORN1/P2K1 (A. thaliana)	A. thaliana, N. tabacum
Extracellular nucleotides	eNAD(P)	NAD(P)	Cytosolic NAD(P)	LecRK-I.8	A. thaliana
Extracellular nucleotides	eDNA	DNA fragments < 700 bp in length	Cytosolic and nuclear DNA	Unknown	Phaseolus vulgaris, P. lunatus, Pisum sativum, Z. mays
Extracellular sugars	Extracellular sugars	Sucrose, glucose, fructose, maltose	Cytosolic sugars	RGS1 (A. thaliana)	A. thaliana, N. tabacum, Solanum tuberosum
Extracellular amino acids and glutathione	Proteinogenic amino acids	Glutamate, cysteine, histidine, aspartic acid	Cytosolic amino acids	GLR3.3/3.6 or others (A. thaliana)	A. thaliana, S. lycopersicum, Oryza sativa
Extracellular amino acids and glutathione	Glutathione	Glutathione	Cytosolic glutathione	GLR3.3/3.6 (A. thaliana)	A. thaliana

Many mammalian DAMPs have DAMP counterparts in plants. One example is with the high-mobility group protein. Mammals have the HMGB1 protein, while Arabidopsis thaliana has the HMGB3 protein.

== Clinical targets in various disorders ==
Preventing the release of DAMPs and blocking DAMP receptors would, in theory, stop inflammation from an injury or infection and reduce pain for the affected individual. This is especially important during surgeries, which have the potential to trigger these inflammation pathways, making the surgery more difficult and dangerous to complete. The blocking of DAMPs also has theoretical applications in therapeutics to treat disorders such as arthritis, cancer, ischemia reperfusion, myocardial infarction, and stroke. These theoretical therapeutic options include:

- Preventing DAMP release – proapoptotic therapies, platinums, ethyl pyruvate
- Neutralizing or blocking DAMPs extracellularly – anti-HMGB1, rasburicase, sRAGE, etc.
- Blocking the DAMP receptors or their signaling – RAGE small molecule antagonists, TLR4 antagonists, antibodies to DAMP-R

DAMPs can be used as biomarkers for inflammatory diseases and potential therapeutic targets. For example, increased S100A8/A9 is associated with osteophyte progression in early human osteoarthritis, suggesting that S100 proteins can be used as biomarkers for the diagnosis of the progressive grade of osteoarthritis. Furthermore, DAMP can be a useful prognostic factor for cancer. This would improve patient classification, and a suitable therapy would be given to patients by diagnosing with DAMPs. The regulation of DAMP signaling can be a potential therapeutic target to reduce inflammation and treat diseases. For example, administration of neutralizing HMGB1 antibodies or truncated HMGB1-derived A-box protein ameliorated arthritis in collagen-induced arthritis rodent models. Clinical trials with HSP inhibitors have also been reported. For nonsmall-cell lung cancer, HSP27, HSP70, and HSP90 inhibitors are under investigation in clinical trials. In addition, treatment with dnaJP1, which is a synthetic peptide derived from DnaJ (HSP40), had a curative effect in rheumatoid arthritis patients without critical side effects. Taken together, DAMPs can be useful therapeutic targets for various human diseases, including cancer and autoimmune diseases.

DAMPs can trigger re-epithelialization upon kidney injury, contributing to epithelial–mesenchymal transition, and potentially, to myofibroblast differentiation and proliferation. These discoveries suggest that DAMPs drive not only immune injury, but also kidney regeneration and renal scarring. For example, TLR2-agonistic DAMPs activate renal progenitor cells to regenerate epithelial defects in injured tubules. TLR4-agonistic DAMPs also induce renal dendritic cells to release IL-22, which also accelerates tubule re-epithelialization in acute kidney injury. Finally, DAMPs also promote renal fibrosis by inducing NLRP3, which also promotes TGF-β receptor signaling.
