= FAM114A1 =

Gene of the species Homo sapiens

Identifiers
- Aliases: FAM114A1, Noxp20, family with sequence similarity 114 member A1
- External IDs: MGI: 1915553; HomoloGene: 12259; GeneCards: FAM114A1; OMA:FAM114A1 - orthologs

Gene location (Mouse)
Chr.	Chromosome 5 (mouse)
Band	5|5 C3.1	Start	65,127,414 bp
Band	5|5 C3.1	End	65,199,229 bp
Orthologs
Species	Human	Mouse
Entrez	92689	68303
Ensembl	ENSG00000197712	ENSMUSG00000029185
UniProt	Q8IWE2	Q9D281
RefSeq (mRNA)	NM_138389; NM_001330764	NM_026667
RefSeq (protein)	NP_001317693; NP_612398; NP_001337560; NP_001337561; NP_001337562 NP_001337563; NP_001337564; NP_001362721; NP_001362722	NP_080943
Location (UCSC)	n/a	Chr 5: 65.13 – 65.2 Mb
PubMed search
- Wikidata
View/Edit Human	View/Edit Mouse

Protein FAM114A1 also known as nervous system overexpressed protein 20 (NOXP20) is a protein that in humans is encoded by the FAM114A1 gene. Orthologs of FAM114A1 can be found in organisms as taxonomically distant from Homo sapiens as Drosophila. However, as expected, human FAM114A! is more like that of primates than any other orthologs. FAM114A1 has one paralog, FAM114A2, which also encodes a protein of unknown function.

== Gene ==
FAM114A1 is located on the short arm of Chromosome 4 (4.p14) in humans on the forward strand sense, it starts at base pair 38869354 and ends at 38947365. Its mRNA has 4138 bp. The gene has the following neighbors on the same chromosome:

TLR1: Toll-like receptor (TLR) 1 plays a role in pathogen recognition and activation of innate immunity.
TLR6: Toll-like receptor (TLR) 6 plays a role in pathogen recognition and activation of innate immunity.
TMEM156: The gene codes for a transmembrane protein.
KLHL5: Kelch-like 5, its protein is thought to have a role in lymphocyte activation.

Gene Neighbor

== Homology ==
Genus and species	Common name	Accession number	Seq. length	Seq. identity	Seq. similarity
Pan troglodytes	Chimpanzee	XP_517149.2	563 a	99%	99%
Macaca mulatta	Rhesus macaque	EHH25809.1	563 a	97%	98%
Nomascus leucogenys	Northern white-cheeked gibbon	XP_003258632.1	562 a	97%	98%
Macaca fascicularis	Crab-eating macaque	EHH53615.1	563 a	96%	98%
Pongo abelii	Sumatran orangutan	XP_002814719.1	563 a	98%	96%
Equus caballus	Horse	XP_001498667.1	562 a	88%	93%
Loxodonta africana	African bush elephant	XP_003411349.1	558 a	85%	91%
Heterocephalus glaber	Naked mole rat	EHB16215.1	561 a	86%	90%
Cavia porcellus	Guinea pig	XP_003471670.1	569 a	86%	90%
Bos taurus	Cow	XP_588946.3	563 a	84%	90%
Sus scrofa	Wild boar	XP_003128969.1	562 a	84%	90%
Ailuropoda melanoleuca	Giant panda	XP_002928170.1	570 a	83%	89%
Canis lupus familiaris	Dog	XP_536261.3	560 a	83%	88%
Rattus norvegicus	Rat	XP_573600.2	567 a	78%	83%
Mus musculus	Mouse	BAB30694.1	569 a	77%	83%
Monodelphis domestica	Gray short-tailed opossum	XP_001374188.1	562 a	72%	81%
Meleagris gallopavo	Wild turkey	XP_003205919.1	563 a	64%	76%
Gallus gallus	Chicken	XP_423859.3	561 a	64%	75%
Taeniopygia guttata	Zebra finch	XP_002189709.1	565 a	61%	75%
Anolis carolinensis	Carolina anole	XP_003226293.1	539 a	61%	75%
Danio rerio	Zebra fish	NP_001082947.1	546 a	57%	72%
Xenopus (silurana) tropicalis	Western clawed frog	XP_002938704.1	424 a	66%	79%

== Expression ==
NOXP20 is over-expressed in the brain, microarray data using the Allen Brain Atlas provides evidence of that expression. Data from NCBI GEO Profile shows that although FAM114A1 is expressed in the brain, its expression goes beyond the nervous tissue to include most of the tissue types in the human body. GEO Profiles also show that FAM114A1 is more expressed in mesenchyme stem cells than in undifferentiated stem cells. Further experiments have shown that there are certain factors that affect the expression of FAM114A1. One example is the direct relation between the over-expression of CLDN-1 and the over-expression of FAM114A1.

== Protein ==
NOXP20 is made up of 563 amino acids and weighs 60742 Da with an iso-electric point of 4.415999. Little is known about the details of this protein, however, there is a good deal of scientific predictions for the protein's structure and function. Like any other protein, this protein undergoes post-translational modifications. The modification that has been proven to be true is phosphorylation on two of the protein's amino acids 196 and 199.

=== Structure ===
There are several tools available to predict the secondary structure of a protein. One tool that combines the results of few of them is PELE on SDSC Biology WorkBench. According to this tool, the protein's secondary structure is mostly alpha helices and coils with some beta strands around the structure.

Predicted Secondary Structure of NOXP20 (based on results from PELE)

=== Interactions ===
There is not proof of any interactions that the FAM114A1 protein has with other proteins in the human body. However, an interaction between FAM114A1 and CDGSH iron sulfur domain 2 was detected in mice. There is 77% identity and 83% similarity between the amino acids of NOXP20 in the two species (Homo sapiens and Mus musculus). Due to the close relation between the two species we can assume that NOXP20 has the same interaction in humans.

=== Function ===
The exact function of NOXP20 is still not well understood. However, there has been evidence that the protein carries a caspase recruiting domain on it. Knowing that caspase is involved in apoptosis, this information leads us to believe that NOXP20 could have a role in apoptosis and regulation of cell proliferation.
