= Pathogen-associated molecular pattern =

Pattern of the immune system

Pathogen-associated molecular patterns (PAMPs) are small molecular motifs conserved within a class of microbes, but not present in the host. They are recognized by toll-like receptors (TLRs) and other pattern recognition receptors (PRRs) in both plants and animals. This allows the innate immune system to recognize pathogens and thus, protect the host from infection.

This initiation of the immune response consists of the secretion of inflammatory cytokines and chemokines. PAMPs can initiate the maturation of immune cells, which can travel to the primary lymph node and trigger the adaptive immune system that involves the production of antibodies against specific antigens.

Although the term "PAMP" is relatively new, the concept that molecules derived from microbes must be detected by receptors from multicellular organisms has been held for many decades, and references to an "endotoxin receptor" are found in much of the older literature. The recognition of PAMPs by the PRRs triggers activation of several signaling cascades in the host immune cells like the stimulation of interferons (IFNs) or other cytokines.

== Role in the immune system ==
Cells that promote innate immunity (dendritic cells, macrophages, neutrophils, and more) express PRRs. Not only do PRRs detect PAMPs, they also detect host-derived damage-associated molecular patterns or DAMPs that are products of tissue damage. Toll-like receptors (TLR), complement receptors (CR), and scavenger receptors are among the many types of PRRs that monitor the cellular environment for invaders and damage. The innate and adaptive immune systems are connected through TLRs because it leads to the secretion of cytokines and chemokines that go on to help recruit lymphocytes.

=== Innate immunity ===
When an antigen breaches the protective barrier (e.g. skin, body hair, or gastrointestinal tract) and enters the tissue or the bloodstream, the initial response is known as the innate immune system. PAMPs are critical to the initiation of the innate immune system because they recognize the danger, which will result in a response against the threat. PAMPs interacting with PRRs initiate signaling pathways that produce chemokines and pro-inflammatory cytokines–creating an inflammatory environment.

The cytokines and chemokines secreted lead to the translocation of dendritic cells that activate T cells, which "help" B-cells secrete antigen-specific antibodies, which is associated with the adaptive immune response. None of these events can occur without the PRR–PAMPs interaction.

== Types ==
A vast array of different types of molecules can serve as PAMPs, including glycans and glycoconjugates. Flagellin is also another PAMP that is recognized via the constant domain, D1 by TLR5. Despite being a protein, its N- and C-terminal ends are highly conserved, due to its necessity for function of flagella. Nucleic acid variants normally associated with viruses, such as double-stranded RNA (dsRNA), are recognized by TLR3 and unmethylated CpG motifs are recognized by TLR9. The CpG motifs must be internalized in order to be recognized by TLR9. Viral glycoproteins, as seen in the viral-envelope, as well as fungal PAMPS on the cell surface or fungi are recognized by TLR2 and TLR4.

=== Gram-negative bacteria ===
Bacterial lipopolysaccharides (LPSs), also known as endotoxins, are found on the cell membranes of gram-negative bacteria, are considered to be the prototypical class of PAMPs. The lipid portion of LPS, lipid A, contains a diglycolamine backbone with multiple acyl chains. This is the conserved structural motif that is recognized by TLR4, particularly the TLR4-MD2 complex. Microbes have two main strategies in which they try to avoid the immune system, either by masking lipid A or directing their LPS towards an immunomodulatory receptor.

Peptidoglycan (PG) is also found within the membrane walls of gram-negative bacteria and is recognized by TLR2, which is usually in a heterodimer of with TLR1 or TLR6.

=== Gram-positive bacteria ===
Lipoteichoic acid (LTA) from gram-positive bacteria, bacterial lipoproteins (sBLP), a phenol soluble factor from Staphylococcus epidermidis, and a component of yeast walls called zymosan, are all recognized by a heterodimer of TLR2 and TLR1 or TLR6. However, LTAs result in a weaker pro-inflammatory response compared to lipopeptides, as they are only recognized by TLR2 instead of the heterodimer.

=== Viruses ===
Viral DNA, viral RNA and CpG are the PAMPs associated with viruses. The PRRs that sense viruses are TLRs, RLRs (Rig-I-like receptors), CLRs (C-type lectine receptors), and inflammasomes/DNA sensors. CLRs are mainly located on myeloid cells, and RLRs are cytoplasmic, mainly detecting viral RNA. TLRs can be located on cell surfaces and the endosomal membrane. Bacterial infections can be intracellular and extracellular, while viral infections are largely intracellular, so endosomal TLRs are most associated with virus detection.

TLR3 recognizes dsRNA while TLR7 and TLR8 detect ssRNA. TLR9's detection of hypomethylated CpG DNA could differentiate virus from self molecules because of the higher CpG content in viruses. PAMPs recognition by TLR is followed by signaling pathways. Viruses may evade the immune response by interacting with proteins in these signaling pathways. By attacking the proteins involved in these pathways, viruses can attempt to evade their destruction.

=== Mycobacteria ===
Mycobacteria are intracellular bacteria which survive in host macrophages. The mycobacterial wall is composed of lipids and polysaccharides and also contains high amounts of mycolic acid. Purified cell wall components of mycobacteria activate mainly TLR2 and also TLR4. Lipomannan and lipoarabinomannan are strong immunomodulatory lipoglycans. TLR2 with association of TLR1 can recognize cell wall lipoprotein antigens from Mycobacterium tuberculosis, which also induce production of cytokines by macrophages. TLR9 can be activated by mycobacterial DNA.

== History ==
First introduced by Charles Janeway in 1989, PAMP was used to describe microbial components that would be considered foreign in a multicellular host. The term "PAMP" has been criticized on the grounds that most microbes, not only pathogens, express the molecules detected; the term microbe-associated molecular pattern (MAMP), has therefore been proposed. A virulence signal capable of binding to a pathogen receptor, in combination with a MAMP, has been proposed as one way to constitute a (pathogen-specific) PAMP. Plant immunology frequently treats the terms "PAMP" and "MAMP" interchangeably, considering their recognition to be the first step in plant immunity, PTI (PAMP-triggered immunity), a relatively weak immune response that occurs when the host plant does not also recognize pathogenic effectors that damage it or modulate its immune response.

== See also ==
- DAMP
- Tissue remodeling
