= AHCC =

Dietary supplement

Chemical structure of partially acylated α-1,4-glucan, the main polysaccharide in AHCC.

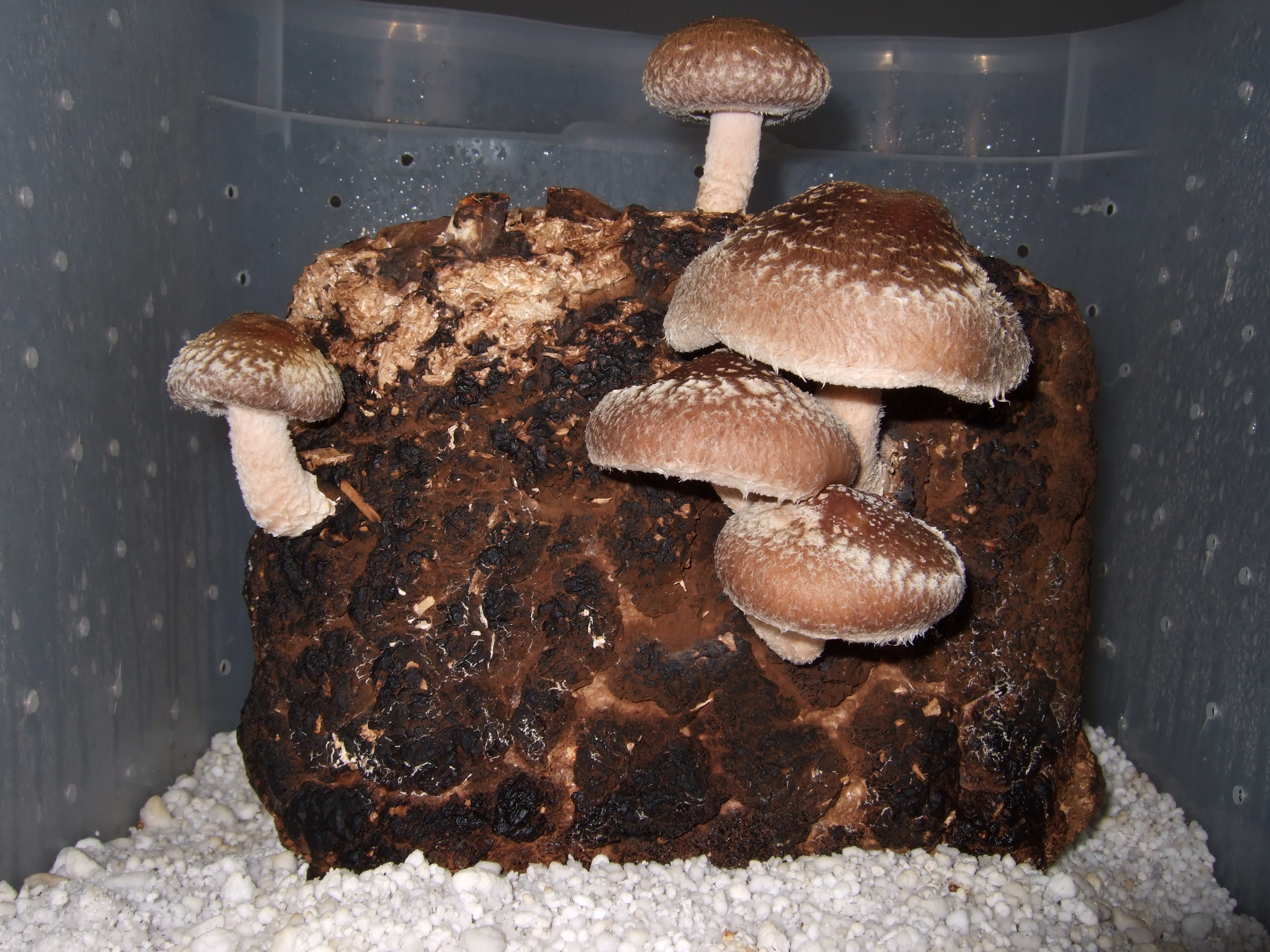
AHCC is a compound produced from Shiitake mushroom.

Active hexose correlated compound (AHCC) is an alpha-glucan rich nutritional supplement produced from shiitake (Lentinula edodes). The product is a subject of research as a potential anti-cancer agent. AHCC is a popular alternative medicine in Japan.

AHCC is a registered trademark of and manufactured by Amino Up Co., Ltd. in Sapporo City, Hokkaido, Japan.

== Development and chemical composition ==
AHCC was developed by Amino Up Co., LTD. and Toshihiko Okamoto (School of Pharmaceutical Sciences, University of Tokyo) in 1989.

Polysaccharides form a large part of the composition of AHCC. These include beta-glucan (β-glucan) and partially acylated α-glucan. Partially acylated α-glucan, produced by the patented long term culturing process, is unique to AHCC. Approximately 20% of the make up of AHCC is α-glucans.

Glucans are saccharides, of which some are known to have immune stimulating effects.

== Potential mechanisms of action ==
The manufacturer of AHCC, Amino Up Co., Ltd., states that the culturing process utilized in its manufacture favors the release of small bioactive molecules that act as nontoxic agonists for toll-like receptors (TLRs), specifically TLR-4, initiating a systemic anti-inflammatory response. AHCC is believed to bind to TLR-2 and TLR-4, and act as an immune modulator, as Immune cells such as CD4+ and CD8+ T cells and natural killer (NK) cells will produce cytokines by either cytokine stimulation by dendritic cells or ligand binding to TLRs.

== Use in integrative medicine ==
AHCC is widely used in the world and many people use it for general health maintenance and treatment of various diseases.

It is often used as a complementary and alternative medicine (CAM) for immune support, as reports in animal and clinical settings have indicated that AHCC is associated with an enhanced response to infection and increased survival. AHCC is in some cases also used by those undergoing conventional cancer therapy (e.g. chemotherapy) for its reported immunomodulatory functions.

In Japan, AHCC is the 2nd most popular complementary and alternative medicine used by cancer patients. Agaricus blazei supplements are the most popular, outpacing AHCC use by a factor of 7:1.

== Research ==
Laboratory research suggests AHCC may have immunostimulatory effects.

AHCC has been proposed as a treatment for cancer, but research into its effectiveness has produced only uncertain and inconclusive evidence. Detailed research is needed into the pharmacology of AHCC before any recommendation of its use as an adjuvant therapy can be made.

Studies have suggested that AHCC supplementation may affect immune outcomes and immune cell populations, suggesting that it has anti-inflammatory effects. Moreover, available data have demonstrated that AHCC may possibly reduce symptoms, improve survival, and shorten recovery time in animal models infected with viruses, bacteria, and fungal infections. AHCC was shown in a double-blind clinical study to completely clear HPV viral load in women chronically affected with the virus, and increase their CD4 counts by 25% to 50% after taking 3 grams after six months.

== See also ==
- Alternative cancer treatments
- Agaricus blazei mushroom
- Medicinal mushrooms
- Shiitake
