= Alexander Steinkasserer =

German-Italian immunologist and professor

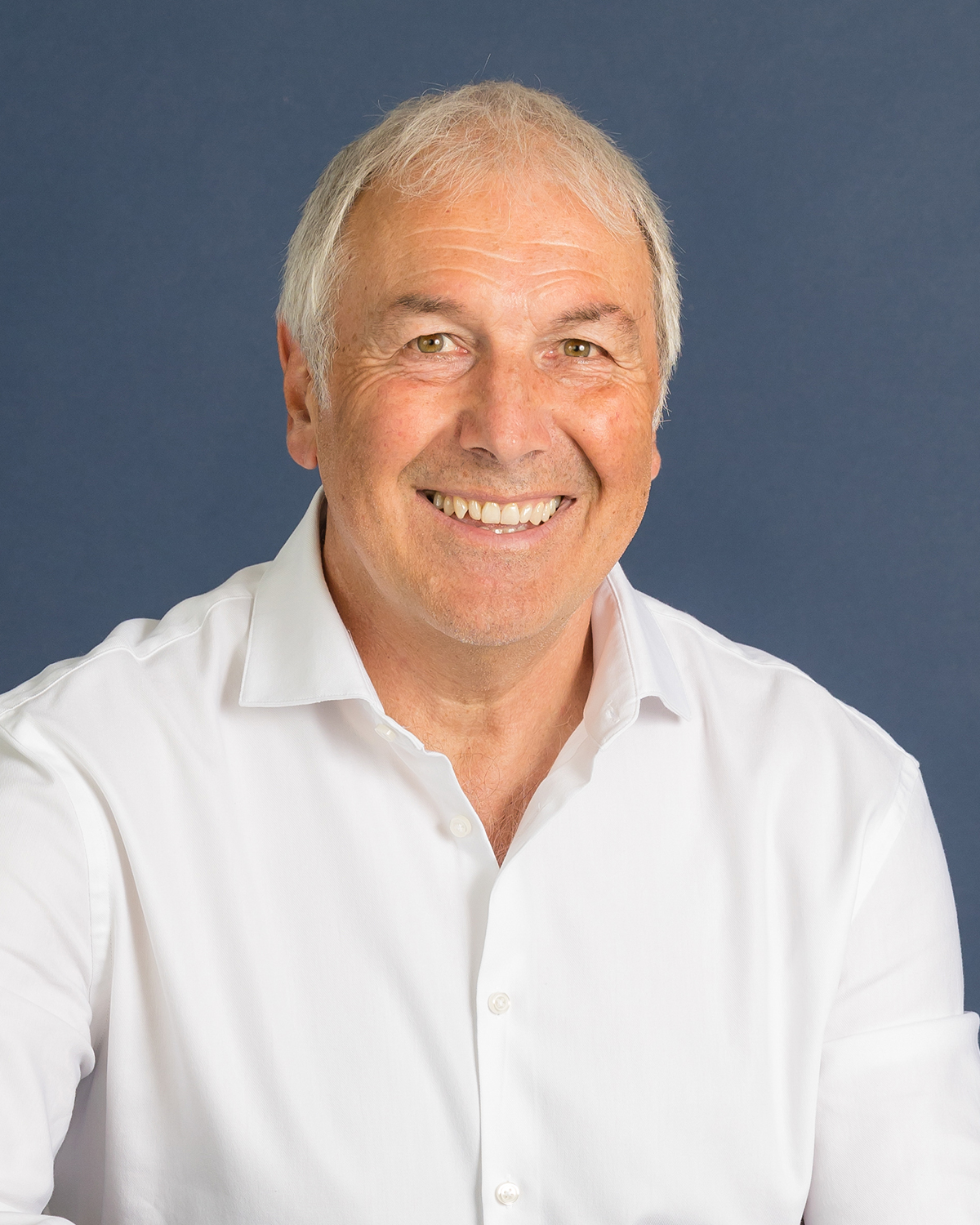
- Alexander Steinkasserer (2023)
- Born: 29 March 1958 (age 68); Bruneck, Italy
- Education: University of Innsbruck
- Known for: Research on CD83
- Awards: Paul Langerhans Prize (2006)
- Scientific career
- Fields: Immunology
- Workplaces: FAU Erlangen–Nuremberg

Alexander Steinkasserer (born 1958 in Bruneck, Italy), is a German-Italian immunologist and professor. He is the Head of the Department of Immune Modulation at the University Hospital Erlangen of the University of Erlangen–Nuremberg (FAU). His research focuses on the biology of dendritic cells, specifically the immunomodulatory properties of the CD83 molecule. He is also a member of the University Council of the Free University of Bozen-Bolzano.

== Education and early career ==
Steinkasserer studied biology at the University of Innsbruck, where he received his PhD in 1984. From 1986 to 1989, he worked as a postdoctoral researcher at LMU Munich. He then moved to the University of Oxford, where he was a research fellow at the Department of Biochemistry and the MRC Immunochemistry Unit under Robert B. Sim from 1989 to 1993.

Between 1993 and 1996, Steinkasserer served as a Laboratory Head at the Novartis Research Institute in Vienna, followed by a position as Division Head at Baxter (Vienna) from 1996 to 1998. In 1996, he completed his Habilitation in Molecular Biology at the University of Vienna.

== Academic career ==
In 1998, Steinkasserer was appointed Professor and Head of the Department of Immune Modulation at the University Hospital Erlangen (FAU Erlangen–Nuremberg).

His scientific work centers on the immune system's regulation, particularly the role of dendritic cells and the surface molecule CD83. His group was among the first to describe the soluble form of CD83 (sCD83) and its therapeutic potential in autoimmune diseases and transplantation. He has published over 200 peer-reviewed articles and has an h-index of 60.

Steinkasserer is also involved in translational research. He is a co-founder of Mallia Innovations (formerly Mallia Therapeutics), a spin-off established to translate CD83 research into therapeutic applications. The project was awarded the m4 Award by the Bavarian Ministry of Economic Affairs in 2021.

In addition to his role in Erlangen, Steinkasserer serves on the University Council of the Free University of Bozen-Bolzano in Italy.

== Awards and honors ==
- 1991: Futura Award for South Tyroleans abroad
- 2003: Research Prize of the Berlin Foundation for Dermatology
- 2006: Paul Langerhans Award of the Arbeitsgemeinschaft Dermatologische Forschung (ADF)

== Selected publications ==
- Leachman, M., et al. (2001). "Dendritic cells generated from blood monocytes of HIV-1 patients are not infected and can be used for vaccinations." Journal of Immunology.
- Zinser, E., et al. (2004). "Prevention and treatment of experimental autoimmune encephalomyelitis by soluble CD83." Journal of Experimental Medicine.
- Prechtel, A.T., & Steinkasserer, A. (2007). "CD83: an update on functions and prospects of the maturational marker of dendritic cells." Immunology.
