= Lipoarabinomannan =

Glycolipid found in mycobacterial cell walls

Lipoarabinomannan, also called LAM, is a glycolipid, and a virulence factor associated with Mycobacterium tuberculosis, the bacteria responsible for tuberculosis. Its primary function is to inactivate macrophages and scavenge oxidative radicals.

The inactivation of macrophages allows for the dissemination of mycobacteria to other parts of the body. The destruction of oxidative radicals allows for the survival of the bacteria, as oxidative free radicals are an important mechanism by which our bodies try to rid ourselves of infection.

== Background ==
Lipoarabinomannan is a lipoglycan and major virulence factor in the bacteria genus Mycobacterium. In addition to serving as a major cell wall component, it is thought to serve as a modulin with immunoregulatory and anti-inflammatory effects. This allows the bacterium to maintain survival in the human reservoir by undermining host resistance and acquired immune responses. These mechanisms include the inhibition of T-cell proliferation and of macrophage microbicidal activity via diminished IFN-γ response. Additional functions of lipoarabinomannan are thought to include the neutralization of cytotoxic oxygen free radicals produced by macrophages, inhibition of protein kinase C, and induction of early response genes.

== Structure ==
Lipoarabinomannan is synthesized via addition of mannose residues to phosphoinositol by a series of mannosyltransferases to produce phosphatidylinositol mannosides (PIMs) and lipomannan (LM). PIM and LM are then glycosylated with arabinan to form LAM. LAM is known to have three primary structural domains. These include a glycosylphosphatidyl anchor which attaches the molecule to the cell wall, a D-mannan core serving as a carbohydrate skeleton, and a terminal D-arabinan, also composing the carbohydrate skeleton. Many arabinofuranosyl side chains branch off the mannose core. It is the covalent modifications to this terminal D-arabinan that creates various LAM structures with their own unique functions to mediate bacterial survival within a host. The presence and the structure of capping allow classification of LAM molecules into three major classes.

=== ManLAM ===
Mannosylated LAMs (ManLAM) are characterized by the presence of mannosyl caps on the terminal D-arabinan. These types of LAMs are most commonly found in more pathogenic Mycobacterium species such as M. tuberculosis, M. leprae, and M. bovis. ManLAM has been shown to be an anti-inflammatory molecule that inhibits production of TNF-α and IL-12 production by human dendritic cells and human macrophages in vitro and to modulate M. tuberculosis–induced macrophage apoptosis via binding to host macrophage mannose receptors. This is particularly important in deactivating host macrophages to allow the bacteria to survive and multiply within them.

==== Proposed mechanisms ====
There are many proposed mechanisms behind ManLAM function. Activation of a PI3K pathway is sufficient to trigger phosphorylation of the Bcl-2 family member Bad by ManLAM. ManLAM is able to activate the serine/threonine kinase Akt via phosphorylation which is then able to phosphorylate Bad. Dephosphorylated Bad serves as a pro-apoptotic protein and its activation allows for cell survival. This demonstrates one virulence-associated mechanism by which bacteria are able to up-regulate signaling pathways to control host cell apoptosis.

ManLAM may also directly activate SHP-1, a phosphotyrosine phosphatase known to be involved in terminating activation signals. SHP-1 negatively regulates pathways related to the actions of IFN-γ and insulin. LAM may regulate SHP-1 by multiple mechanisms including direct interactions, phosphorylation, and subcellular localization. Once activated, SHP-1 translocates from the cytosol to the membrane. By activating a phosphatase, LAM can inhibit LPS and IFN-γ induced protein tyrosine phosphorylation in monocytes. This decreases production of TNF-α, a molecule necessary in forming granulomas against M. tuberculosis and important in macrophage defense against bacterium via nitrogen oxide production. LAM's activation of SHP-1 also works to deactivate IL-12. IL-12 is important for innate resistance to M. tuberculosis infections. It activates natural killer cells which produce IFN-γ to activate macrophages. By impairing the function of these two molecules by SHP-1 activation, ManLAM may promote intracellular survival.

Other models suggest that ManLAM acts to mediate immunosuppressive effects through suppression of LPS-induced IL-12 p40 protein production. ManLAM is thought to inhibit the IL-1 receptor-associated kinase (IRAK)-TRAF6 interaction, IκB-α phosphorylation, and nuclear translocation of c-Rel and p50 which causes reduced IL-12 p40 production.

Proposed mechanisms of ManLAM functions

==== PILAM ====
LAMS capped with phosphoinositol are typically found in nonpathogenic species including M. smegmatis. In contrast to ManLAMs, PILAMs are pro-inflammatory. CD14, a recognition receptor present on macrophages, associated with toll-like receptor 2 (TLR2) is described to be a receptor for PILAM. Binding of PILAM to the receptor elicits the activation of an intracellular signaling cascade which activates transcription factors that initiate transcription of proinflammatory cytokine genes. This may lead to TNF-α, IL-8, and IL-12 activation and apoptosis of macrophages.

==== AraLAM (CheLAM) ====
Certain species of rapid-growing bacterium such as M. chelonae and laboratory strains (H37Ra) contain LAMs that are absent of both mannose and phosphoinositol caps. This form of LAM is characterized by 1,3–mannosyl side chains instead of the 1,2 commonly found in others mycobacterial species. These forms are considered to be more potent than the mannose-capped ManLAM in inducing functions associated with macrophage activation. In addition to stimulation of early genes such as c-fos, KC, and JE, AraLAM induces transcription of the mRNA for cytokines (such as TNF-α, IL 1-α, IL 1-β, IL-6, IL-8, and IL-10) characteristically produced by macrophages. Proto-oncogenes c-fos and c-myc are involved in the regulation of gene transcription while JE and KC are peptide cytokines that serve as specific chemoattractants for neutrophils and monocytes. Activation of TNF-α creates pathologic manifestations of disease such as tissue necrosis, nerve damage, and protective immunity. O-acyl groups of the arabinomannan moiety may be responsible for TNF-inducing activity which causes the tuberculosis symptoms of fever, weight loss, and necrosis. However, the presence of ManLAMs decreases AraLAM activity, suppressing an immune response.

== Point-of-care TB Diagnosis ==
Fujifilm SILVAMP TB LAM is a LAM based urine point-of-care test, using silver halide amplification technology. Up to 60% of people with HIV are unable to produce a sputum sample, leading to delays in TB diagnosis for these patients, which often proves deadly. Foundation for Innovative New Diagnostics (FIND) and Fujifilm developed the test, which is particularly useful in low-income settings, where the burden of HIV and TB is the highest. It takes an hour, doesn't rely on electricity, and requires limited training for health workers. A study with 968 HIV+ hospital inpatients found the Fujifilm SILVAMP TB LAM test to have a 28.1% higher sensitivity than the Alere Determine TB LAM Ag and the Fujifilm SILVAMP TB LAM could diagnose 65% of patients with active TB within 24 h. A meta-analysis with 1,595 inpatients and outpatients showed 70.7% sensitivity and 90.9% specificity for TB diagnosis in people living with HIV for Fujifilm SILVAMP TB LAM. Further, FujiLAM showed good sensitivity for the detection of extrapulmonary TB (EPTB) ranging from 47 to 94% across different forms of EPTB and could have rapidly diagnosed TB in up to 89% of HIV-positive inpatients who died within 12 weeks. The test showed a high positive predictive value (95.2%) in HIV-negative outpatients and has the potential to improve rapid, urine-based TB diagnosis in general populations at the point-of-care. Large prospective studies are on the way.
