= Lipomannan =

Mycobacterium immune virulence factor

Lipomannan (LM) is a mycobacterium immune agonist and a major constituent of the mycobacterial cell wall. This glycoconjugate is a virulence factor that plays a key role in the human immune system via interaction with various immune cells, acting in particular as a trigger for TLR2. It is also considered to be a biosynthetic precursor of lipoarabinomannan (LAM).

== Structure ==
It is a trigger for TLR 2.

It consists of an α-linked mannan, which consists of 50–70 residues, with some branches points linked glycosidically to a diglyceride of which the fatty acids are similar to those of the whole cell lipid. In addition, succinic acid residues are present as O-acyl substituents on about one in four of the mannose residues, the terminal carboxyl group of the succinic acid providing the whole polymer with a considerable number of acidic functions.

Lipomannan has functional components that resemble lipoteichoic acids; a lipophilic glyceride region and a hydrophilic portion with frequent acid groups.

Lipomannan is a phosphorylated polysaccharide associated with the cell envelope and is considered to be the multimannosylated form of PIM which is primarily located in the plasma membrane. Structurally, LM is composed of two segments: a PI anchor to which is attached an α-D-mannan domain; both play key roles in inducing cytokine production by phagocytic cells. Mannose core consists of a linear α(1-6)-linked mannan backbone extending from the c-6 of the myo-inositol; the mannan chains is further substituted by α-(1-2) man-p side branches.
