= Toll-like receptor 1 =

Cell surface receptor found in humans

TLR1
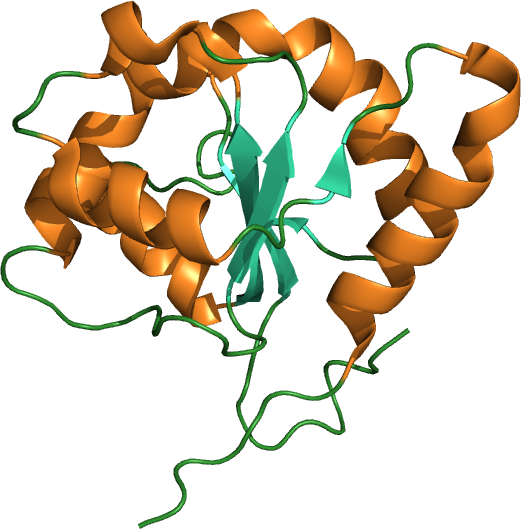

Identifiers
- Aliases: TLR1, CD281, TIL, TIL. LPRS5, rsc786, toll like receptor 1
- External IDs: OMIM: 601194; MGI: 1341295; GeneCards: TLR1
Available structures
PDB	Ortholog search: PDBe RCSB
PDB	List of PDB id codes 2Z7X, 1FYV

Gene location (Human)
Chr.	Chromosome 4 (human)
Band	4p14	Start	38,790,677 bp
Band	4p14	End	38,856,817 bp

Gene location (Mouse)
Chr.	Chromosome 5 (mouse)
Band	5 C3.1|5 33.53 cM	Start	65,082,022 bp
Band	5 C3.1|5 33.53 cM	End	65,090,906 bp
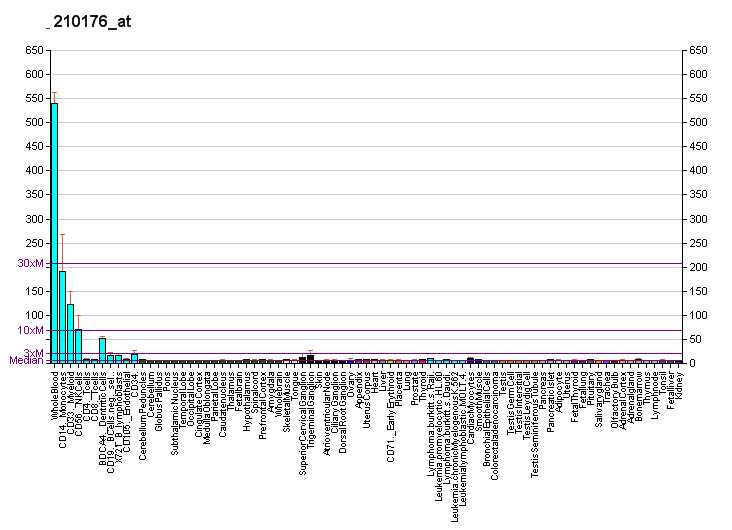
RNA expression pattern
Bgee	Human / Mouse (ortholog); Top expressed in: monocyte; blood; bone marrow cell; Achilles tendon; granulocyte; appendix; gallbladder; spleen; lymph node; periodontal fiber / Top expressed in: mesenteric lymph nodes; left colon; spleen; blood; submandibular gland; external carotid artery; internal carotid artery; subcutaneous adipose tissue; stroma of bone marrow; cervix; More reference expression data
BioGPS	More reference expression data
Gene ontology
Molecular function	Toll-like receptor 2 binding; protein binding; protein heterodimerization activity; lipopeptide binding; transmembrane signaling receptor activity; signaling receptor activity; identical protein binding
Cellular component	integral component of membrane; phagocytic vesicle membrane; Golgi apparatus; membrane; plasma membrane; Toll-like receptor 1-Toll-like receptor 2 protein complex; integral component of plasma membrane; membrane raft; cytoplasmic vesicle
Biological process	defense response; toll-like receptor TLR1:TLR2 signaling pathway; immune system process; MyD88-dependent toll-like receptor signaling pathway; cellular response to triacyl bacterial lipopeptide; detection of triacyl bacterial lipopeptide; toll-like receptor 1 signaling pathway; macrophage activation; inflammatory response; signal transduction; innate immune response; defense response to bacterium; cell activation; toll-like receptor signaling pathway; immune response; positive regulation of toll-like receptor 2 signaling pathway
Sources:Amigo / QuickGO
Orthologs
Databases	NCBI: entry; OMA: entry
Species	Human	Mouse
Entrez	7096	21897
Ensembl	ENSG00000174125	ENSMUSG00000044827
UniProt	Q15399	Q9EPQ1
RefSeq (mRNA)	NM_003263	NM_001276445; NM_030682
RefSeq (protein)	NP_003254	NP_001263374; NP_109607
Location (UCSC)	Chr 4: 38.79 – 38.86 Mb	Chr 5: 65.08 – 65.09 Mb
PubMed search
- Wikidata
View/Edit Human	View/Edit Mouse

Toll-like receptor 1 (TLR1) is a member of the toll-like receptor (TLR) family of pattern recognition receptors (PRRs) that form the cornerstone of the innate immune system. TLR1 recognizes bacterial lipoproteins and glycolipids in complex with TLR2. TLR1 is a cell surface receptor. In humans, TLR1 is encoded by the TLR1 gene, which is located on chromosome 4.

== Function ==
The binding of ligands to TLR1 activates intracellular signaling cascades leading to an inflammatory response and initiation of immune processes.

TLR1 cooperates with TLR2 in the recognition of bacterial triacyl lipoproteins. TLR1 has been shown to recognize the outer surface lipoprotein of Borrelia burgdorferi. The important role of TLR1 in recognizing triacyl lipopeptides has been shown in TLR1-deficient mice.

Toll-like receptors, including TLR-1, found on the epithelial cell layer that lines the small and large intestine are important players in the management of the gut microbiota and detection of pathogens.

== Expression ==
TLR1 is synthesized in the endoplasmic reticulum. The trafficking of TLR1 from endoplasmic reticulum is controlled by protein associated with TLR4 (PRAT4A), which is endoplasmic reticulum resident chaperone. TLR1 is then transported to Golgi complex and to cell membrane.

TLR1 mRNA was expressed at high levels in the kidney, lung, and spleen in adult humans, but in low levels in fetal brain and liver as well as in HeLa cell line.

TLR1 is expressed in the highest levels on NK cells compared to other TLRs. TLR1 has been found to be expressed on human peripheral blood γδT cells, myeloid-derived suppressor cells, platelets, CD4+ T cells, microglia, astrocytes, immature dendritic cells, LTi-like innate lymphoid cells and eosinophils. It is also found on the surface of macrophages and neutrophils.

== Structure ==
TLR1 is a type I transmembrane glycoprotein composed of extracellular, transmembrane and intracellular domains.

The extracellular domain of TLR1 contains leucine-rich repeat (LRR) domains, which play a crucial role in binding PAMPs. The LRR domains can be further categorized into three subdomains: the N-terminal, central, and C-terminal regions. While the N-terminal and C-terminal domains of TLR1 exhibit relative consistency with a consensus amino acid structure represented as xLxxLxxLxLxxNxLxxLPxxxFx, the central domains display significant variability. Notably, the central domains of TLR1 lack the presence of stabilizing asparagine ladders, which contribute to the typical horseshoe-like shape of the extracellular domain of TLRs. Furthermore, the number of residues within the LRR domains of the central region varies between 20 and 33 residues. Additionally, extra alpha helices were found in central domains of TLR1. The biological function of TLR1 is closely linked to the structural modifications in its extracellular domain, which are responsible for its capacity to bind ligands.

The intracellular domain of TLR1 consists of a toll/interleukin-1 receptor (TIR) domain, which is shared by various adaptor proteins involved in the signaling cascade initiated by TLRs. The TIR domain of TLR1 has been found as a monomer in the crystal structure.

TLR1 is able to recognize ligands as a complex with TLR2, referred to as TLR2/1 heterodimer. TLR2 can heterodimerize also with TLR6 forming TLR2/6 heterodimer. TLR2/1 adopts an "m"-shaped conformation when interacted with its ligands. The "m" shape conformation is formed by extracellular domains of TLR1 and TLR2, bringing the transmembrane and intracellular domains in close association. This conformational arrangement subsequently triggers a downstream signaling cascade.

TLR2/1 specifically recognizes triacyl lipopeptides, whereas TLR2/6 recognizes diacyl lipopeptides. Diacyl and triacyl lipopeptides are present on the bacterial outer membrane. In the case of triacyl lipopeptides, the mechanism behind their recognition lies in the incorporation of two lipid chains into the hydrophobic pocket of TLR2, while the remaining lipid chain inserts into a hydrophobic pocket of TLR1. Regarding TLR6, the hydrophobic pocket is obstructed by the side chains of two phenylalanine residues, resulting in a smaller pocket than in TLR1. This structural difference accounts for the distinct ligand specificities exhibited by TLR2/1 and TLR2/6 heterodimers.

== Interactions ==
TLR1 has been shown to interact with TLR2. TLR1 recognizes peptidoglycan and (triacyl) lipopeptides in concert with TLR2 (as a heterodimer).
