= Toll-like receptor 6 =

Protein found in humans

TLR6

Identifiers
- Aliases: TLR6, CD286, toll like receptor 6
- External IDs: OMIM: 605403; MGI: 1341296; GeneCards: TLR6
Available structures
PDB	Ortholog search: PDBe RCSB
PDB	List of PDB id codes 4OM7

Gene location (Human)
Chr.	Chromosome 4 (human)
Band	4p14	Start	38,822,897 bp
Band	4p14	End	38,856,817 bp

Gene location (Mouse)
Chr.	Chromosome 5 (mouse)
Band	5 C3.1|5 33.54 cM	Start	65,109,374 bp
Band	5 C3.1|5 33.54 cM	End	65,117,440 bp
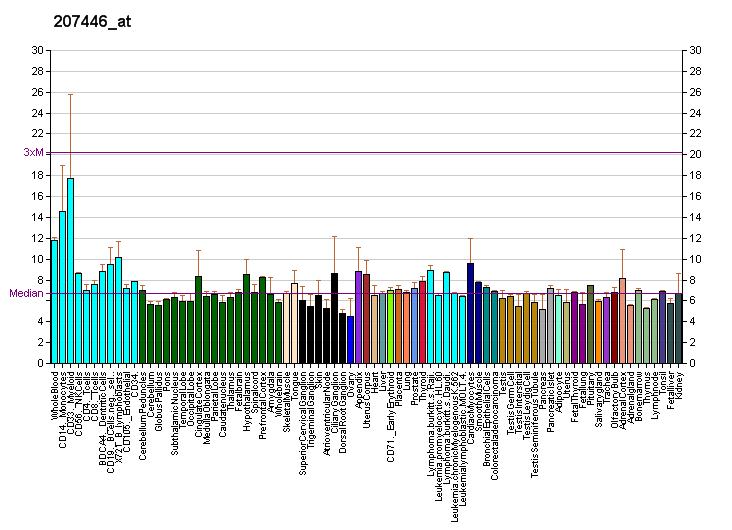
RNA expression pattern
Bgee	Human / Mouse (ortholog); Top expressed in: monocyte; blood; lymph node; granulocyte; spleen; appendix; bone marrow cell; Achilles tendon; tonsil; gallbladder / Top expressed in: granulocyte; embryo; blood; stroma of bone marrow; spleen; muscle of thigh; thymus; calvaria; carotid body; tibiofemoral joint; More reference expression data
BioGPS	More reference expression data
Gene ontology
Molecular function	Toll-like receptor 2 binding; protein binding; transmembrane signaling receptor activity; lipopeptide binding; amyloid-beta binding; signaling receptor binding; signaling receptor activity; identical protein binding; protein heterodimerization activity
Cellular component	integral component of membrane; phagocytic vesicle membrane; membrane; integral component of plasma membrane; cytoplasmic vesicle; Golgi apparatus; membrane raft; Toll-like receptor 2-Toll-like receptor 6 protein complex; plasma membrane; intracellular anatomical structure; receptor complex
Biological process	positive regulation of NLRP3 inflammasome complex assembly; immune system process; positive regulation of JUN kinase activity; cellular response to diacyl bacterial lipopeptide; activation of NF-kappaB-inducing kinase activity; toll-like receptor 6 signaling pathway; defense response to bacterium; positive regulation of I-kappaB kinase/NF-kappaB signaling; inflammatory response; toll-like receptor TLR6:TLR2 signaling pathway; detection of diacyl bacterial lipopeptide; signal transduction; innate immune response; T-helper 1 type immune response; MyD88-dependent toll-like receptor signaling pathway; nitric oxide metabolic process; response to bacterial lipoprotein; microglial cell activation; toll-like receptor signaling pathway; cell activation; immune response; positive regulation of gene expression; negative regulation of toll-like receptor 2 signaling pathway; TRIF-dependent toll-like receptor signaling pathway; positive regulation of macrophage activation; positive regulation of nitric oxide biosynthetic process; positive regulation of NF-kappaB transcription factor activity; cellular response to oxidised low-density lipoprotein particle stimulus; positive regulation of cytokine production involved in inflammatory response; positive regulation of oxidative stress-induced neuron death; positive regulation of reactive oxygen species biosynthetic process; cellular response to amyloid-beta
Sources:Amigo / QuickGO
Orthologs
Databases	NCBI: entry; OMA: entry
Species	Human	Mouse
Entrez	10333	21899
Ensembl	ENSG00000174130	ENSMUSG00000051498
UniProt	Q9Y2C9	Q9EPW9
RefSeq (mRNA)	NM_006068; NM_001394553	NM_011604; NM_001359180; NM_001384171
RefSeq (protein)	NP_006059	NP_035734; NP_001346109; NP_001371100
Location (UCSC)	Chr 4: 38.82 – 38.86 Mb	Chr 5: 65.11 – 65.12 Mb
PubMed search
- Wikidata
View/Edit Human	View/Edit Mouse

Toll-like receptor 6 is a protein that in humans is encoded by the TLR6 gene. TLR6 is a transmembrane protein, member of toll-like receptor family, which belongs to the pattern recognition receptor (PRR) family. TLR6 acts in a heterodimer form with toll-like receptor 2 (TLR2). Its ligands include multiple diacyl lipopeptides derived from gram-positive bacteria and mycoplasma and several fungal cell wall saccharides. After dimerizing with TLR2, the NF-κB intracellular signalling pathway is activated, leading to a pro-inflammatory cytokine production and activation of innate immune response. TLR6 has also been designated as CD286 (cluster of differentiation 286).

== Function ==
The protein encoded by this gene is a member of the toll-like receptor (TLR) family which plays a fundamental role in pathogen recognition and activation of innate immunity. TLRs are highly conserved from Drosophila to humans and share structural and functional similarities. They recognize pathogen-associated molecular patterns (PAMPs) that are expressed on infectious agents, and mediate the production of cytokines necessary for the development of effective immunity. The various TLRs exhibit different patterns of expression. This receptor functionally interacts with toll-like receptor 2 (TLR2) to mediate cellular response to gram-positive bacteria, mycoplasma, fungi, some viruses and even protozoa.

== Interactions ==
TLR6 has been shown to interact in a heterodimer form with TLR2. Synergistic interactions of TLR2/6 and TLR9 leading to higher resistance against lung infection have also been reported.

== Agonists ==
Unlike TLR2/1 heterodimer, which recognizes triacylated lipopeptides, the TLR2/6 heterodimer is known to be specific for diacylated lipopeptides such as lipoteichoic acid, found on the cell wall of gram-positive bacteria or macrophage-activating lipopeptide (MALP2), found on the cell membrane of mycoplasma. It is also known that TLR2/6 binds some viral products, among them hepatitis C core and NS3 protein from the hepatitis C virus and glycoprotein B from cytomegalovirus. Several fungal ligands such as glucuronoxylomannan, phospholipomannan and zymosan have been reported. Moreover, TLR2/6 is known to bind one protozoan ligand – lipopeptidophosphoglycan. TLR2/6 can also be activated by synthetic lipopeptides, such as Pam_{2}CSK_{4} or Fibroblast–stimulating lipopeptide (FSL-1).

== Signalling ==
After ligand recognition, TLR6 receptor dimerizes with TLR2. Ligand-mediated dimerization is crucial for recruiting the adaptor proteins, which are necessary for transmitting the signal inside the cell. TLR2/6 heterodimer, just as most of the Toll-like receptors, generally induces MyD88-dependent intracellular signalling pathway, which leads to nuclear translocation of nuclear factor-κB (NF-κB), resulting in the production of pro-inflammatory cytokines. But MyD88 also activates mitogen‐activated protein kinases (MAPKs). However, several strains of lactic acid bacteria have been reported to stimulate immune regulation via TLR2/6, leading to tolerogenic interleukin 10 secretion, instead of pro-inflammatory cytokine secretion.

== Expression ==
In human, TLR6 is highly expressed in appendix, spleen and lymph node. Among the immune cells, TLR6 has been detected in conventional dendritic cells, monocytes, macrophages, microglia, neutrophils, NK cells and B lymphocytes.

== Clinical significance ==
A 359T>C single-nucleotide polymorphism (SNP) in the extracellular leucine rich repeat domain is associated with susceptibility to Legionnaires' Disease. Increased occurrence of asthma in some populations may be associated with Ser249Pro polymorphism, also present in the extracellular domain of the encoded protein. On the other hand, a protective SNP also exists - S249P is possibly liked to protection from bronchial asthma and resistance from asthma in children.
