= Ethyl pyruvate =

Ethyl Pyruvate
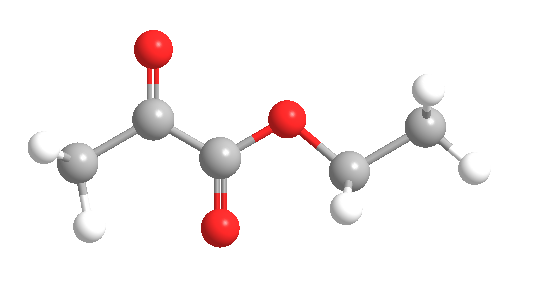
- Ethyl Pyruvate ball and stick model

Names
- Other names ethyl 2-oxopropanoate Ethyl-2-oxopropanoat; Propanoic acid, 2-oxo-, ethyl ester Pyruvic acid, ethyl ester (8CI)

Identifiers
CAS Number	617-35-6
3D model (JSmol)	Interactive image
ChEBI	CHEBI:173421
ChEMBL	ChEMBL173373
ChemSpider	11544
DrugBank	DB05869
ECHA InfoCard	100.009.557
EC Number	210-511-2
PubChem CID	12041
UNII	03O98E01OB
UN number	3272
CompTox Dashboard (EPA)	DTXSID2060674
- InChI: InChI=1S/C5H8O3/c1-3-8-5(7)4(2)6/h3H2,1-2H3 Key: XXRCUYVCPSWGCC-UHFFFAOYSA-N
- SMILES: CCOC(=O)C(=O)C

Properties
Chemical formula	C_{5}H_{8}O_{3}
Molar mass	116.12 g mol^{−1}
Appearance	colorless liquid
Density	1.045 g cm^{−3}
Melting point	−58 °C (−72 °F; 215 K)
Boiling point	142 °C (288 °F; 415 K) 760
Solubility in water	10 g L^{−1} (at 20 °C)
log P	0.048

Hazards
- Occupational safety and health (OHS/OSH)
Main hazards	Flammable/Irritant
- GHS labelling
Pictograms	(GHS02: Flammable)
Signal word	Warning
Hazard statements	H226
Precautionary statements	P210, P233, P240, P241, P242, P243, P280, P303+P361+P353, P370+P378, P403+P235, P501
NFPA 704 (fire diamond)	2 2 0
Flash point	45 °C
Safety data sheet (SDS)	External MSDS
- Except where otherwise noted, data are given for materials in their standard state (at 25 °C [77 °F], 100 kPa). Infobox references

Ethyl pyruvate is a colorless organic compound with a molecular formula of C_{5}H_{8}O_{3}.

== Structure ==
Ethyl pyruvate is small molecule with both ketone and ester functionality. The molecule has no hydrogen donors, but three atoms that are hydrogen receptors. Three of the bonds are rotatable and there are no stereocenters. The molecule has two carbonyl carbons, which can act as electrophiles, as well as three α-hydrogens. Ethyl Pyruvate can also be synonymous with ethyl 2-oxopropanoate, Ethyl-2-oxopropanoat, Propanoic acid, 2-oxo-, ethyl ester, Pyruvic acid, and ethyl ester

== Research and applications ==
Three independent studies of ethyl pyruvate were performed, with rats as their test subjects, and each produced an optimistic result. The first study showed that ethyl pyruvate has a protective role against phosgene-induced pulmonary edema.

The second study showed the therapeutic effects of ethyl pyruvate against severe acute pancreatitis. This study concluded three things: First, ethyl pyruvate prevents the severe acute pancreatitis-induced hepatic expression of tumor necrosis factor α (TNF-α) and interleukin-1β (IL-1β). Second, ethyl pyruvate protects the rats from severe acute pancreatitis-induced liver and pancreas damages. Third, ethyl pyruvate controls liver severe acute pancreatitis induced by NF-κB activation. The third study showed the effects of sodium pyruvate (SP) and ethyl pyruvate (EP) as treatments to brain injury. This experiment concluded that the pyruvate treatments proved beneficial neurologically post-cortical contusion injury (CCI).

The effects of ethyl pyruvate as an antioxidant were compared to that of its sodium salt in a recent study. Ethyl pyruvate has a greater lipophilicity than sodium pyruvate, which allows it to be a more effective scavenger in the reaction. This study was done using a liver homogenate as the model for cell membrane transport deletion. Hypochlorous acid was used as the oxidant, and the focus of the study was on the capacity of the pyruvates to scavenge the reactive oxygen species. Ethyl pyruvate is a good antioxidant due to its α-ketocarboxylate structure, which allows it to reduce hydrogen peroxide to water and scavenge the hydroxyl radical through decarboxylation.

Amino-2H-imidazoles are a new class of BACE-1 inhibitors for the treatment of Alzheimer's disease. Amino-2H-imidazoles were introduced because current treatments of Alzheimer's disease only treat the symptoms, but do not correct the underlying neuropathology. Ethyl pyruvate is used as a reactant in the synthesis of many of these new BACE-1 inhibitors.

Overall, ethyl pyruvate has been found to be beneficial in wound healing, liver disease, pancreatitis, and spinal cord repair. Relating to health, there are still many researchers using ethyl pyruvate in their projects pertaining to myocardial ischemia, reperfusion, and human gastric cancer.

== Preparation and reactions ==
Ethyl pyruvate can be synthesized in a simple, one-step reaction from the oxidation of ethyl lactate. Since ethyl lactate is slightly cheaper to buy than ethyl pyruvate, this synthesis can be useful. There are many different reagents that can be used to push the reaction forward to yield in excess of 98%, such as using potassium permanganate and aluminum sulfate hydrate in dichloromethane solvent.

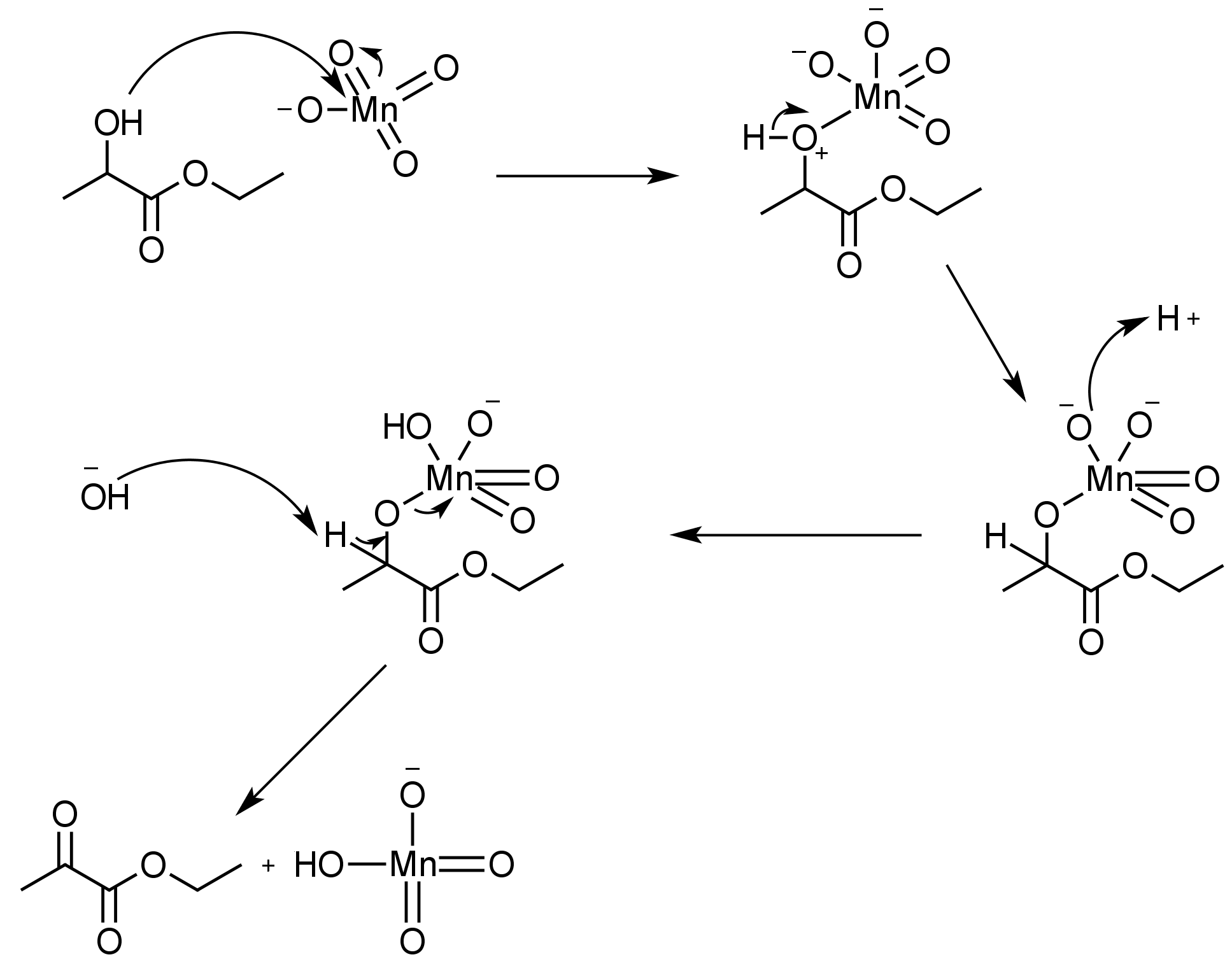
"Mechanism of Ethyl Pyruvate formation"

Ethyl pyruvate can undergo reduction (chemistry) as well. For example, when reduced by sodium borohydride the ketone gets reduced to an alcohol, leaving the ester group untouched. But, when ethyl pyruvate is reduced by lithium aluminium hydride, both the ketone and ester get completely reduced to alcohols.

Enantioselective reactions are extremely important in chemistry, as the formation of optically pure products is especially useful in the food, pharmaceutical, and agrochemical industries. An important enantioselective reaction in modern chemistry involves the hydrogenation of α-ketoesters, including ethyl pyruvate. These reactions produce α-hydroxiesters, which are chiral compounds that can be further modified to synthesize important biologically active compounds. In the hydrogenation of ethyl pyruvate, Pt/SiO_{2} catalysts were modified with a chiral agent, cinchonidine. Without the addition of tin, the enantioselectivity was largely dependent on the size of the particles - larger particles dictated higher enantioselective success. With the promotion of small amounts of tin, the hydrogenation rate and the enantioselective success both increased. However, a critical amount was reached, where additional tin decreased the hydrogenation rate along with the enantioselective success of the reaction.
