= Toll-like receptor 2 =

Cell surface receptor found in humans

TLR2
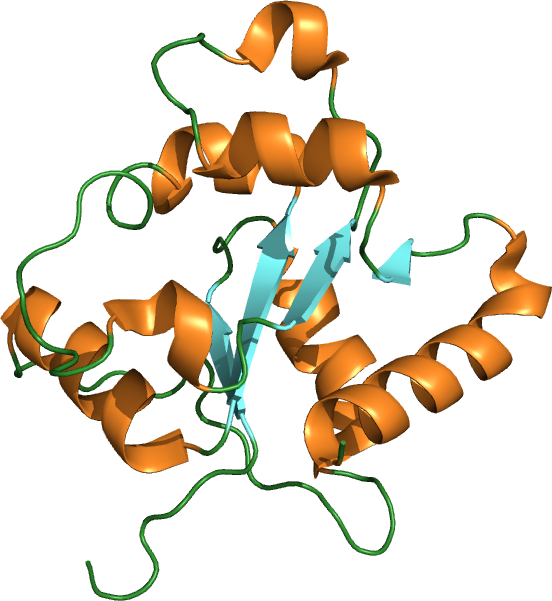

Identifiers
- Aliases: TLR2, CD282, TIL4, toll like receptor 2
- External IDs: OMIM: 603028; MGI: 1346060; GeneCards: TLR2
Available structures
PDB	Ortholog search: PDBe RCSB
PDB	List of PDB id codes 1FYW, 1FYX, 1O77, 2Z7X, 2Z80

Gene location (Human)
Chr.	Chromosome 4 (human)
Band	4q31.3	Start	153,684,070 bp
Band	4q31.3	End	153,706,260 bp

Gene location (Mouse)
Chr.	Chromosome 3 (mouse)
Band	3|3 E3	Start	83,743,579 bp
Band	3|3 E3	End	83,749,074 bp
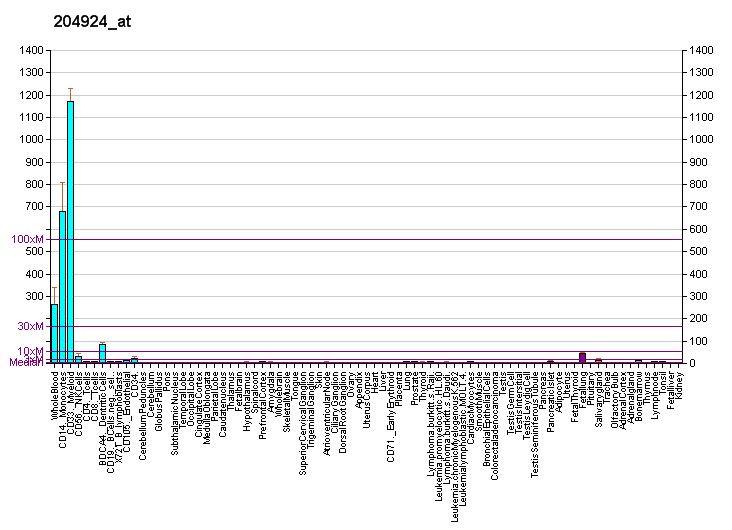
RNA expression pattern
Bgee	Human / Mouse (ortholog); Top expressed in: monocyte; blood; granulocyte; right lung; upper lobe of left lung; spleen; bone marrow; cartilage tissue; bone marrow cell; periodontal fiber / Top expressed in: granulocyte; stroma of bone marrow; right lung lobe; tibiofemoral joint; calvaria; islet of Langerhans; conjunctival fornix; epithelium of lens; cervix; vestibular membrane of cochlear duct; More reference expression data
BioGPS	More reference expression data
Gene ontology
Molecular function	pattern recognition receptor activity; lipopolysaccharide binding; Toll-like receptor binding; triacyl lipopeptide binding; protein binding; peptidoglycan binding; protein heterodimerization activity; lipopolysaccharide immune receptor activity; transmembrane signaling receptor activity; lipopeptide binding
Cellular component	cytoplasm; integral component of membrane; phagocytic vesicle membrane; Golgi apparatus; membrane; intrinsic component of plasma membrane; plasma membrane; Toll-like receptor 1-Toll-like receptor 2 protein complex; integral component of plasma membrane; membrane raft; cytoplasmic vesicle; cell projection; cell surface; cell body
Biological process	interleukin-10 production; positive regulation of interferon-beta production; defense response to Gram-positive bacterium; positive regulation of interleukin-18 production; positive regulation of toll-like receptor signaling pathway; toll-like receptor TLR1:TLR2 signaling pathway; positive regulation of inflammatory response; cellular response to bacterial lipopeptide; positive regulation of interleukin-12 production; immune system process; detection of diacyl bacterial lipopeptide; cellular response to diacyl bacterial lipopeptide; I-kappaB phosphorylation; positive regulation of nitric-oxide synthase biosynthetic process; MyD88-dependent toll-like receptor signaling pathway; cellular response to triacyl bacterial lipopeptide; detection of triacyl bacterial lipopeptide; positive regulation of Wnt signaling pathway; positive regulation of gene expression; cellular response to lipoteichoic acid; positive regulation of NF-kappaB transcription factor activity; immune response; positive regulation of interleukin-8 production; positive regulation of interleukin-6 production; positive regulation of tumor necrosis factor production; positive regulation of chemokine production; innate immune response; inflammatory response; toll-like receptor TLR6:TLR2 signaling pathway; response to molecule of bacterial origin; signal transduction; positive regulation of transcription by RNA polymerase II; apoptotic process; response to lipopolysaccharide; response to progesterone; toll-like receptor signaling pathway; response to insulin; central nervous system myelin formation; nitric oxide metabolic process; response to fatty acid; leukotriene metabolic process; toll-like receptor 2 signaling pathway; positive regulation of oligodendrocyte differentiation; response to bacterial lipoprotein; negative regulation of cell population proliferation; response to toxic substance; response to hypoxia; positive regulation of interleukin-10 production; lipopolysaccharide-mediated signaling pathway; microglial cell activation
Sources:Amigo / QuickGO
Orthologs
Databases	NCBI: entry; OMA: entry
Species	Human	Mouse
Entrez	7097	24088
Ensembl	ENSG00000137462	ENSMUSG00000027995
UniProt	O60603	Q9QUN7
RefSeq (mRNA)	NM_003264; NM_001318787; NM_001318789; NM_001318790; NM_001318791 NM_001318793; NM_001318795; NM_001318796	NM_011905
RefSeq (protein)	NP_001305716; NP_001305718; NP_001305719; NP_001305720; NP_001305722 NP_001305724; NP_001305725; NP_003255	NP_036035
Location (UCSC)	Chr 4: 153.68 – 153.71 Mb	Chr 3: 83.74 – 83.75 Mb
PubMed search
- Wikidata
View/Edit Human	View/Edit Mouse

Toll-like receptor 2 also known as TLR2 is a protein that in humans is encoded by the TLR2 gene. TLR2 has also been designated as CD282 (cluster of differentiation 282). TLR2 is one of the toll-like receptors and plays a role in the immune system. TLR2 is a membrane protein, a receptor, which is expressed on the surface of certain cells and recognizes foreign substances and passes on appropriate signals to the cells of the immune system.

== Function ==
The protein encoded by this gene is a member of the toll-like receptor (TLR) family, which plays a fundamental role in pathogen recognition and activation of innate immunity. TLRs are highly conserved from Drosophila to humans and share structural and functional similarities. They recognize pathogen-associated molecular patterns (PAMPs) that are expressed on infectious agents, and mediate the production of cytokines necessary for the development of effective immunity. The various TLRs exhibit different patterns of expression. This gene is expressed most abundantly in peripheral blood leukocytes, and mediates host response to Gram-positive bacteria and yeast via stimulation of NF-κB.

In the intestine, TLR2 regulates the expression of CYP1A1, which is a key enzyme in detoxication of carcinogenic polycyclic aromatic hydrocarbons such as benzo(a)pyrene.

== Background ==
The immune system recognizes foreign pathogens and eliminates them. This occurs in several phases. In the early inflammation phase, pathogens are recognized by antibodies that are already present (innate or acquired through prior infection; see also cross-reactivity). Immune-system components (e.g. complement) are bound to the antibodies and kept near, in reserve to disable them via phagocytosis by scavenger cells (e.g. macrophages). Dendritic cells are likewise capable of phagocytizing but do not do it for the purpose of direct pathogen elimination. Rather, they infiltrate the spleen and lymph nodes, and each presents components of an antigen there, as the result of which specific antibodies are formed that recognize precisely that antigen.

These newly formed antibodies would arrive too late in an acute infection, however, so what we think of as "immunology" constitutes only the second half of the process. Because this phase would always start too late to play an essential role in the defense process, a faster-acting principle is applied ahead of it, one that occurs only in forms of life that are phylogenetically more highly developed.

Pattern-recognition receptors (PRRs) come into play here. These are receptors that recognize the gross, primarily structural features of molecules not innate to the host organism. PRRs include, for example, lipids with a totally different basic chemical structure. Such receptors are bound directly to cells of the immune system and cause immediate activation of their respective nonspecific immune cells.

== Mechanism ==
As a membrane surface receptor, TLR2 recognizes many bacterial, fungal, viral, and certain endogenous substances. In general, this results in the uptake (internalization, phagocytosis) of bound molecules by endosomes/phagosomes and in cellular activation; thus such elements of innate immunity as macrophages, PMNs and dendritic cells assume functions of nonspecific immune defense, B1a and MZ B cells form the first antibodies, and specific antibody formation gets started in the process. Cytokines participating in this include tumor necrosis factor-alpha (TNF-α) and various interleukins (IL-1α, IL-1β, IL-6, IL-8, IL-12). Before the TLRs were known, several of the substances mentioned were classified as modulins. Due to the cytokine pattern, which corresponds more closely to T_{h}1, an immune deviation is seen in this direction in most experimental models, away from T_{h}2 characteristics. Conjugates are being developed as vaccines or are already being used without a priori knowledge.

A peculiarity first recognized in 2006 is the expression of TLR2 on Tregs (a type of T cell), which experience both TCR-controlled proliferation and functional inactivation. This leads to disinhibition of the early inflammation phase and of specific antibody formation. Following a reduction in pathogen count, many pathogen-specific Tregs are present that, now without a TLR2 signal, become active and inhibit the specific and inflammatory immune reactions (see also TNF-β, IL-10). Older literature that ascribes a direct immunity-stimulating effect via TLR2 to a given molecule must be interpreted in light of the fact that the TLR2 knockouts employed typically have very few Tregs.

Functionally relevant polymorphisms are reported that cause functional impairment and thus, in general, reduced survival rates, in particular in infections/sepsis with Gram-positive bacteria.

Signal transduction is depicted under Toll-like receptor.

== Expression ==
TLR2 is expressed on microglia, Schwann cells, monocytes, macrophages, dendritic cells, polymorphonuclear leukocytes (PMNs or PMLs), B cells (B1a, MZ B, B2), and T cells, including Tregs (CD4+CD25+ regulatory T cells). In some cases, it occurs in a heterodimer (combination molecule), e.g., paired with TLR-1 or TLR-6. TLR2 is also found in the epithelia of air passages, pulmonary alveoli, renal tubules, and the Bowman's capsules in renal corpuscles. TLR2 is also expressed by intestinal epithelial cells and subsets of lamina propria mononuclear cells in the gastrointestinal tract. In the skin, it is found on keratinocytes and sebaceous glands; spc1 is induced here, allowing a bactericidal sebum to be formed.

== Cancer ==
TLR2 gene has been observed progressively downregulated in Human papillomavirus-positive neoplastic keratinocytes derived from uterine cervical preneoplastic lesions at different levels of malignancy. For this reason, TLR2 is likely to be associated with tumorigenesis and may be a potential prognostic marker for uterine cervical preneoplastic lesions progression.

== Agonists ==
The following ligands have been reported to be agonists of the toll-like receptor 2:

Agonist	Organism
Lipoteichoic acid	Gram-positive bacteria
atypical LPS such as LOS	Leptospirosis, P. gingivalis, A. muciniphila, etc.
MALP-2 and MALP-404 (lipoproteins)	Mycoplasma
-	Chlamydophila pneumoniae
OspA	Borrelia burgdorferi (Lyme disease)
Porin	Neisseria meningitidis, Haemophilus influenzae
Antigen mixtures	Cutibacterium acnes
LcrV	Yersinia
Lipomannan	Mycobacterium: Mycobacterium tuberculosis
GPI anchor	Trypanosoma cruzi
Lysophosphatidylserine	Schistosoma mansoni
Lipophosphoglycan (LPG)	Leishmania major
Glycophosphatidylinositol (GPI)	Plasmodium falciparum
Zymosan (a β-glucan)	S. cerevisiae
-	Malassezia (commensal yeast)
Antigen mixtures (α-glucans and β-glucans)	C. albicans, A. fumigatus, C. neoformans, P. boydii
hsp60, as peptide transporter and adjuvant for antigen presentation	-
Glycoprotein (gH/gL, gB)	Herpes simplex virus
-	Varicella zoster virus
-	Cytomegalovirus (CMV)
Hemagglutinin	Measles
Active hexose correlated compound (AHCC) (an α-glucan)	Shiitake

== Interactions ==
=== Protein-protein interactions ===
TLR 2 has been shown to interact with TLR 1 and TOLLIP. It has been shown that TLR2 can interact with spike and E-protein of SARS-CoV-2. The result of these interactions can be the activation of the immune system.

=== Protein-ligand interactions ===
TLR2 resides on the plasma membrane where it responds to lipid-containing PAMPs such as lipoteichoic acid and di- and tri-acylated cysteine-containing lipopeptides. It does this by forming dimeric complexes with either TLR 1 or TLR6 on the plasma membrane. TLR2 interactions with malarial glycophosphatidylinositols of Plasmodium falciparum was shown and a detailed structure of TLR–GPI interactions was computationally predicted.

== Gene polymorphisms ==
Various single nucleotide polymorphisms (SNPs) of the TLR2 have been identified and for some of them an association with faster progression and a more severe course of sepsis in critically ill patients was reported. No association with occurrence of severe staphylococcal infection was found. Moreover, a recent study reported rs111200466, a TLR2 promoter insertion/deletion polymorphism as a prognosis factor in HIV-1 disease progression. The authors showed a correlation of the polymorphism with a faster progression to the CD4+ < 200 cells/μL outcome for the deletion allele carriers.
