= Alpha glucan =

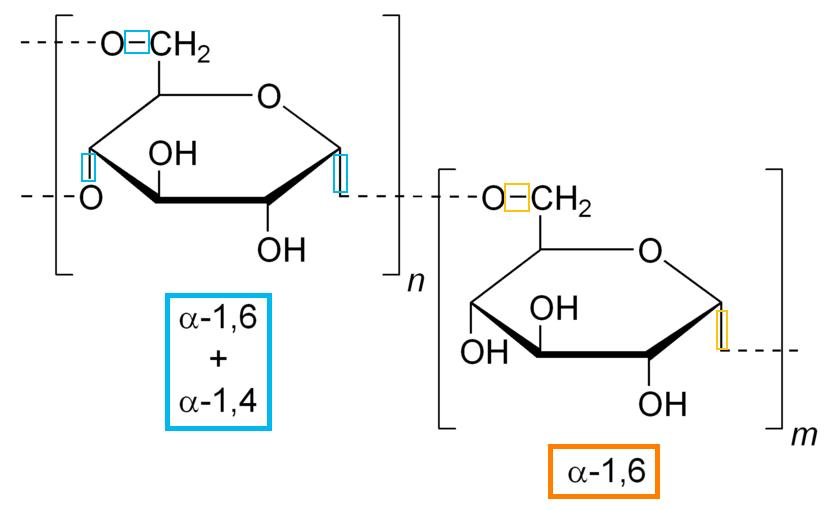
Diagram showing orientation and location of different alpha-glucan linkages.

α-Glucans (alpha-glucans) are polysaccharides of D-glucose monomers linked with glycosidic bonds of the alpha form. α-Glucans use cofactors in a cofactor site in order to activate a glucan phosphorylase enzyme. This enzyme causes a reaction that transfers a glucosyl portion between orthophosphate and α-I,4-glucan. The position of the cofactors to the active sites on the enzyme are critical to the overall reaction rate thus, any alteration to the cofactor site leads to the disruption of the glucan binding site.

Alpha-glucan is also commonly found in bacteria, yeasts, plants, and insects. Whereas the main pathway of α-glucan synthesis is via glycosidic bonds of glucose monomers, α-glucan can be comparably synthesized via the maltosyl transferase GlgE and branching enzyme GlgB. This alternative pathway is common in many bacteria, which use GlgB and GlgE or the GlgE pathway exclusively for the biosynthesis of α-glucan. The GlgE pathway is especially prominent in actinomycetes, such as mycobacteria and streptomycetes. However, α-glucans in mycobacteria have a slight variation in the length of linear chains, which point to the fact that the branching enzyme in mycobacteria makes shorter branches compared to glycogen synthesis. For organisms that can utilize both classic glycogen synthesis and the GlgE pathway, only GlgB enzyme is present, which indicates that the GlgB enzyme is shared between both pathways.

Other uses for α-glucan have been developed based on its availability in bacteria. The accumulation of glycogen Neisseria polysaccharea and other bacteria are able to use in α-glucan to catalyze glucose units to form α-1,4-glucan and liberating fructose in the process. To regulate carbohydrate metabolism, more resistant starch was necessary. An α-glucan coated starch molecule produced from Neisseria polysacchera was able to improve some of the physiochemical properties in comparison to raw normal starch, especially in loading efficiency of bioactive molecules. Alpha-glucan was used in conjunction with modified starch molecules that contained porous starch granules via hydrolysis with amylotic enzymes such as α-amylase, β-amylase, and glucoamylase. An α-glucan coating boasts protection from digestive environments, such as the small intestine, efficient encapsulation, and preservation rates. This design promotes the growth of the development of α-glucan-based bio-materials and many implications for its usage in food and pharmaceutical industries.

== Examples of alpha glucans ==
- dextran, α-1,6-glucan
- glycogen, α-1,4- and α-1,6-glucan
- pullulan, α-1,4- and α-1,6-glucan
- starch, α-1,4- (such as amylose) and α-1,6-glucan (including amylopectin)

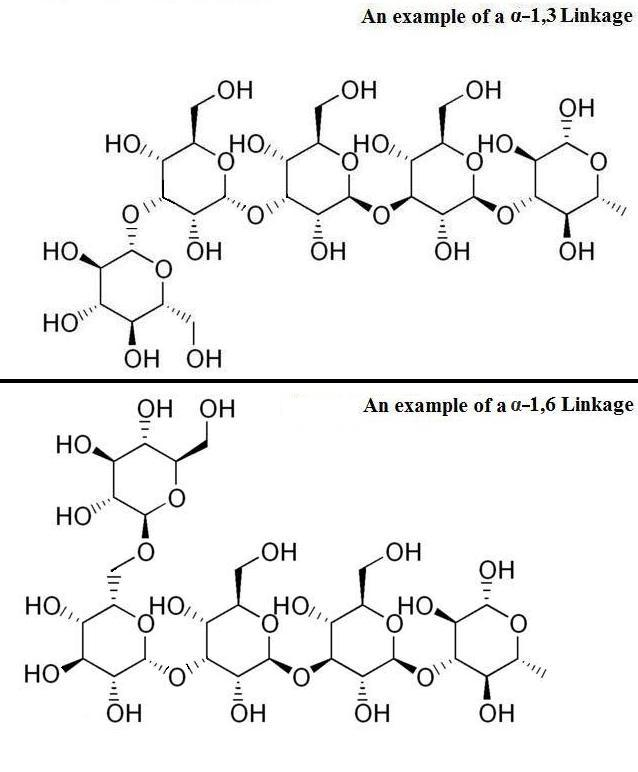
Examples of alpha-glucan molecules with different glycosidic bonds.
