= CD83 =

Human cell-surface glycoprotein involved in immune regulation

Identifiers
- Aliases: CD83, BL11, HB15, CD83 molecule
- External IDs: OMIM: 604534; MGI: 1328316; GeneCards: CD83

Gene location (Human)
Chr.	Chromosome 6 (human)
Band	6p23	Start	14,117,256 bp
Band	6p23	End	14,136,918 bp

Gene location (Mouse)
Chr.	Chromosome 13 (mouse)
Band	13 A4|13 21.6 cM	Start	43,938,251 bp
Band	13 A4|13 21.6 cM	End	43,956,608 bp
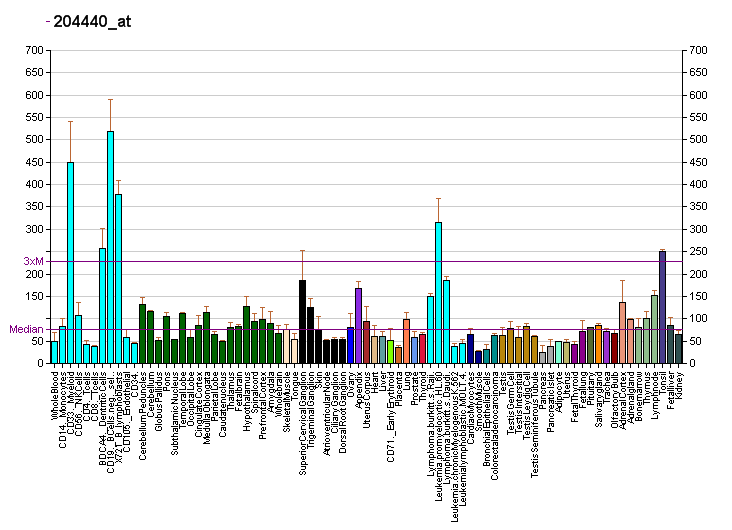
RNA expression pattern
Bgee	Human / Mouse (ortholog); Top expressed in: secondary oocyte; endothelial cell; middle temporal gyrus; visceral pleura; Brodmann area 23; parietal pleura; tonsil; epithelium of nasopharynx; lateral nuclear group of thalamus; cartilage tissue / Top expressed in: mesenteric lymph nodes; motor neuron; lumbar subsegment of spinal cord; spleen; facial motor nucleus; vas deferens; central gray substance of midbrain; thymus; anterior horn of spinal cord; saccule; More reference expression data
BioGPS	More reference expression data
Gene ontology
Molecular function	protein binding
Cellular component	integral component of membrane; plasma membrane; integral component of plasma membrane; external side of plasma membrane; membrane
Biological process	regulation of cytokine production; defense response; positive regulation of CD4-positive, alpha-beta T cell differentiation; humoral immune response; response to organic cyclic compound; positive regulation of interleukin-2 production; negative regulation of interleukin-4 production; signal transduction; positive regulation of interleukin-10 production
Sources:Amigo / QuickGO
Orthologs
Databases	NCBI: entry; OMA: entry
Species	Human	Mouse
Entrez	9308	12522
Ensembl	ENSG00000112149	ENSMUSG00000015396
UniProt	Q01151	O88324
RefSeq (mRNA)	NM_004233; NM_001040280; NM_001251901	NM_001289915; NM_009856
RefSeq (protein)	NP_001035370; NP_001238830; NP_004224	NP_001276844; NP_033986
Location (UCSC)	Chr 6: 14.12 – 14.14 Mb	Chr 13: 43.94 – 43.96 Mb
PubMed search
- Wikidata
View/Edit Human	View/Edit Mouse

CD83 (cluster of differentiation 83) is a cell-surface glycoprotein of the immunoglobulin superfamily encoded in humans by the CD83 gene. It is expressed primarily by activated immune cells, including dendritic cells, T cells, B cells and regulatory T cells, as well as by microglia and cortical thymic epithelial cells (cTECs) in the thymus. CD83 contributes to the regulation of immune responses, including the resolution of inflammation and the induction of immunological tolerance.

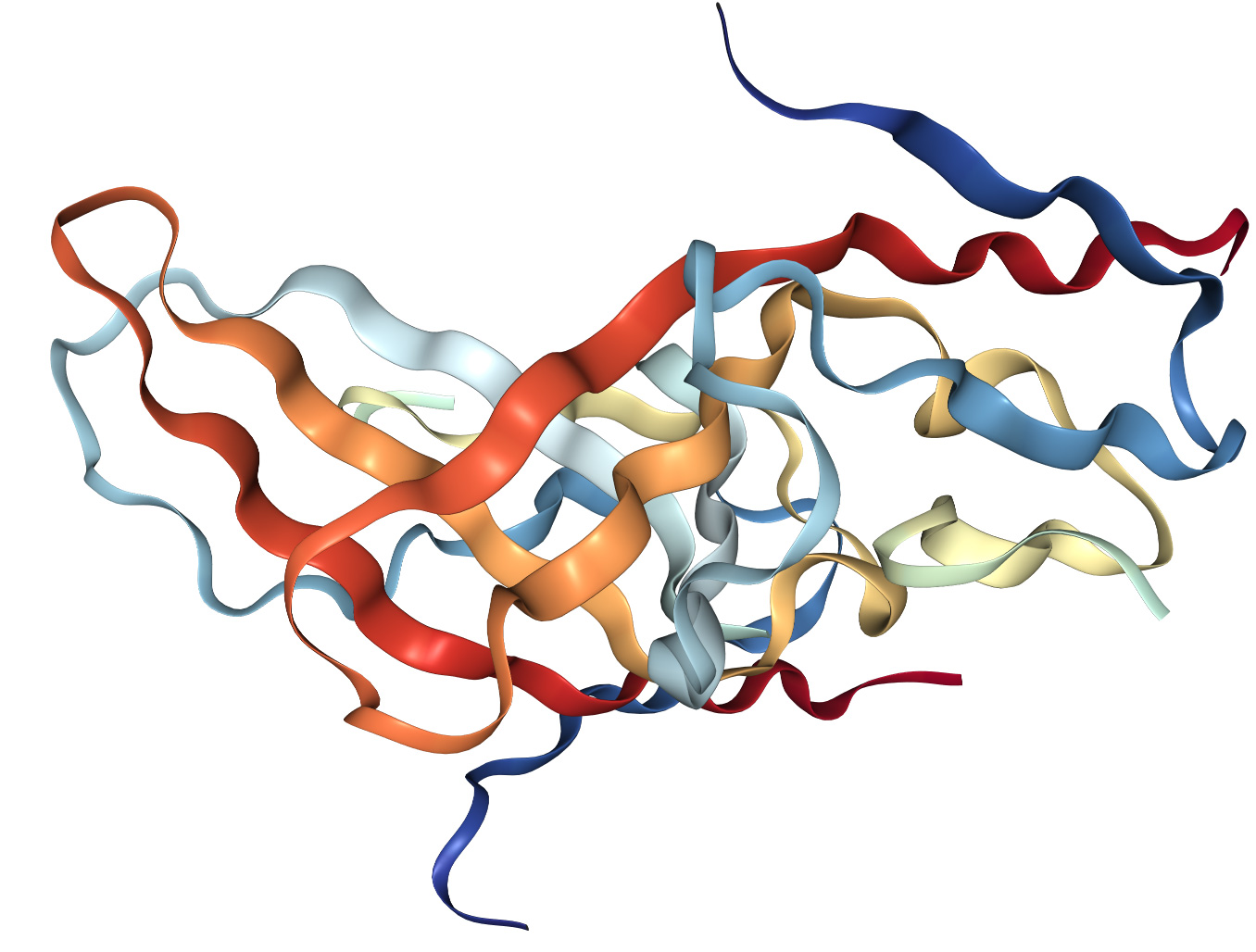
Crystal structure of the extracellular domain of the dimeric human sCD83 protein

== Structure ==
CD83 occurs in two biologically relevant forms:

- Membrane-bound CD83 (mCD83) is a type I transmembrane protein comprising an extracellular V-type immunoglobulin-like domain, a transmembrane region and a short cytoplasmic signaling domain. It is expressed on activated immune cells and functions as an immunological checkpoint involved in the resolution of inflammation and in limiting excessive autoimmune responses. Membrane-bound CD83 is thought to form trimers.
- Soluble CD83 (sCD83) comprises the extracellular immunoglobulin-like domain alone and is shed from the surface of activated immune cells. Soluble CD83 can assemble into dodecameric complexes and induces immunoregulatory processes, including the induction of tolerogenic dendritic cells, regulatory T cells (T_{reg} cells) and pro-resolving macrophages.

Both forms of CD83 are glycosylated. CD83 mRNA is transported from the cell nucleus to the cytosol through the export receptor CRM1. The soluble form has structural similarities to B7-1, B7-2 and CD48.

== Gene ==
The CD83 gene is located on the short arm of human chromosome 6 (6p23) and on mouse chromosome 13. The human CD83 promoter extends approximately 261 base pairs upstream of the transcription start site and contains several binding sites for NF-κB and interferon regulatory factors. This organization reflects the integration of CD83 into signaling pathways controlled by cytokines and inflammatory mediators.

Binding sites for the aryl hydrocarbon receptor (AhR) have also been identified in the promoter and in an enhancer region within the second intron. This arrangement suggests that CD83 transcription may be negatively regulated by gut-derived microbial metabolites and other AhR ligands.

== Function ==
CD83 participates in the maturation, activation and homeostasis of B cells, T cells and dendritic cells.

The transmembrane region of mCD83 stabilizes MHC II molecules, costimulatory molecules such as CD86, and CD28 in the plasma membrane by antagonizing MARCH-family E3 ubiquitin ligases. By stabilizing these molecules, mCD83 regulates the efficiency of antigen presentation and subsequent T-cell activation.

=== Ligands ===
The precise physiological ligands of mCD83 have not been fully characterized. Early binding studies showed that murine B cells, human immature and mature dendritic cells, and activated CD8^{+} T cells can bind sCD83, but did not identify a specific individual receptor. mCD83 has also been reported to engage in homotypic interactions with the soluble form.

Loss of mCD83 on immune cells is associated in preclinical models with excessive autoimmune responses in multiple sclerosis, rheumatoid arthritis, neuroinflammatory disease and inflammatory bowel disease.

sCD83 binds the TLR4/MD-2 complex on monocytes and osteoclasts. Through the TRIF signaling pathway, it activates indoleamine 2,3-dioxygenase (IDO), which produces the tryptophan metabolite kynurenine. Kynurenine in turn induces regulatory T cells, which can limit or resolve excessive immune responses. In preclinical studies, sCD83 has also modulated allergic T-helper-cell type 2 immune responses, including in experimental allergic rhinitis, and reduced allograft rejection.

=== Cd4^{+} t-cell selection in the thymus ===
The development of CD4^{+} T cells during positive selection is regulated substantially by CD83 expression on cortical thymic epithelial cells (cTECs). During positive selection, CD4^{+}CD8^{+} double-positive thymocytes interact with cTECs through their T-cell receptors. A non-functional interaction results in cell death, whereas appropriate recognition permits survival and commitment to either the CD4 or CD8 lineage according to recognition of MHC II or MHC I, respectively. mCD83 inhibits the activity of the MHC-II-degrading MARCH8 E3 ubiquitin ligase in cTECs, thereby regulating MHC-II expression. Loss of CD83 in cTECs markedly reduces the peripheral CD4^{+} T-cell population.

=== Regulatory t cells ===
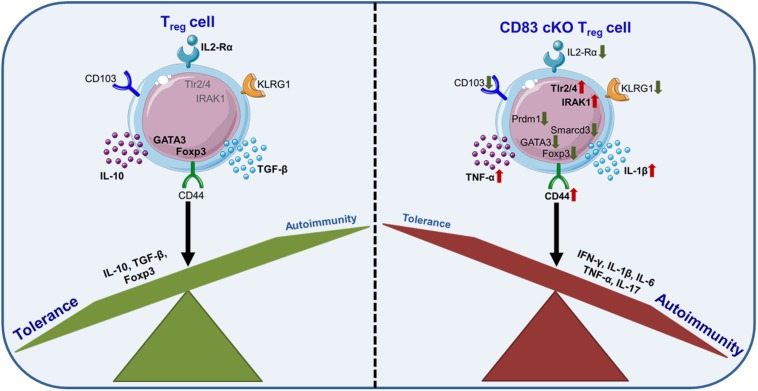
Role of CD83 in establishing immunological tolerance

Regulatory T cells (T_{reg} cells) comprise thymically derived and peripherally induced populations. They express the transcription factor FOXP3, which establishes their suppressive phenotype. Although FOXP3 expression is unchanged in CD83 knockout mice, mCD83 is important for peripheral induction of T_{reg} cells. Mice with T_{reg}-cell-specific CD83 deficiency have reduced numbers of these cells and develop a pro-inflammatory phenotype with excessive autoimmune responses, including in experimental colitis.

CD83 deletion also causes an imbalance in T_{reg}-cell effector function, including decreased expression of GATA3, a transcription factor important for expression of the ST2 receptor. Activated T_{reg} cells also express and secrete sCD83, which can downregulate IRAK-1 in inflamed tissue and contribute to the induction of tolerance mechanisms.

=== Dendritic cells ===
CD83 expression is a classical marker of mature dendritic cells. As in cTECs, CD83 stabilizes MHC-II expression in dendritic cells by antagonizing MARCH1 E3 ubiquitin ligases. Dendritic-cell-specific CD83 knockout mice show reduced surface MHC II and CD86, indicating that CD83 is a central regulator of dendritic-cell phenotype. Specific deletion of CD83 in dendritic cells also leads to excessive autoimmune responses, including in a preclinical model of multiple sclerosis.

=== B cells ===
Expression of mCD83 correlates with B-lymphocyte activation and is regulated by signaling through the B-cell receptor, CD40 and Toll-like receptors. In B-cell-specific CD83 knockout mice, B-cell proliferation is increased. mCD83 does not directly affect antibody affinity maturation, but promotes class switching to IgE, suggesting a role in the development of allergic responses and making CD83 a potential therapeutic target in allergy.

=== sCD83 in hair growth and follicle regeneration ===
Recent preclinical studies have identified soluble CD83 (sCD83) as a modulator of hair growth and regeneration of resting hair follicles. In preclinical models, sCD83 administration activated hair follicles and accelerated the transition from the resting telogen phase to the growth anagen phase. A proposed multimodal mechanism involves the differentiation of macrophages towards pro-resolving M2 phenotypes and recruitment of regulatory T cells. These cell types can resolve inflammatory microenvironments around hair follicles and promote activation of resident hair-follicle stem cells.

Transcriptomic analyses of human hair follicles indicate that sCD83 activates Wnt signaling and downregulates inhibitors of anagen growth, including Dkk-1. In ex vivo cultures of human hair follicles, sCD83 accelerated hair-shaft elongation, prolonged anagen and inhibited transition to telogen, in part through inhibition of apoptosis in hair follicles.

In a preclinical model of alopecia areata, sCD83 reversed autoimmune hair loss and induced new hair growth; the proposed mechanism was IDO-mediated activation of regulatory T cells. A scientific commentary also reported the first successful cosmetic use of an sCD83-based product in one individual. In 2025, the European Patent Office granted a patent for the use of sCD83 in promoting hair growth and wound healing.

== See also ==
- Cluster of differentiation
