= Zymosan =

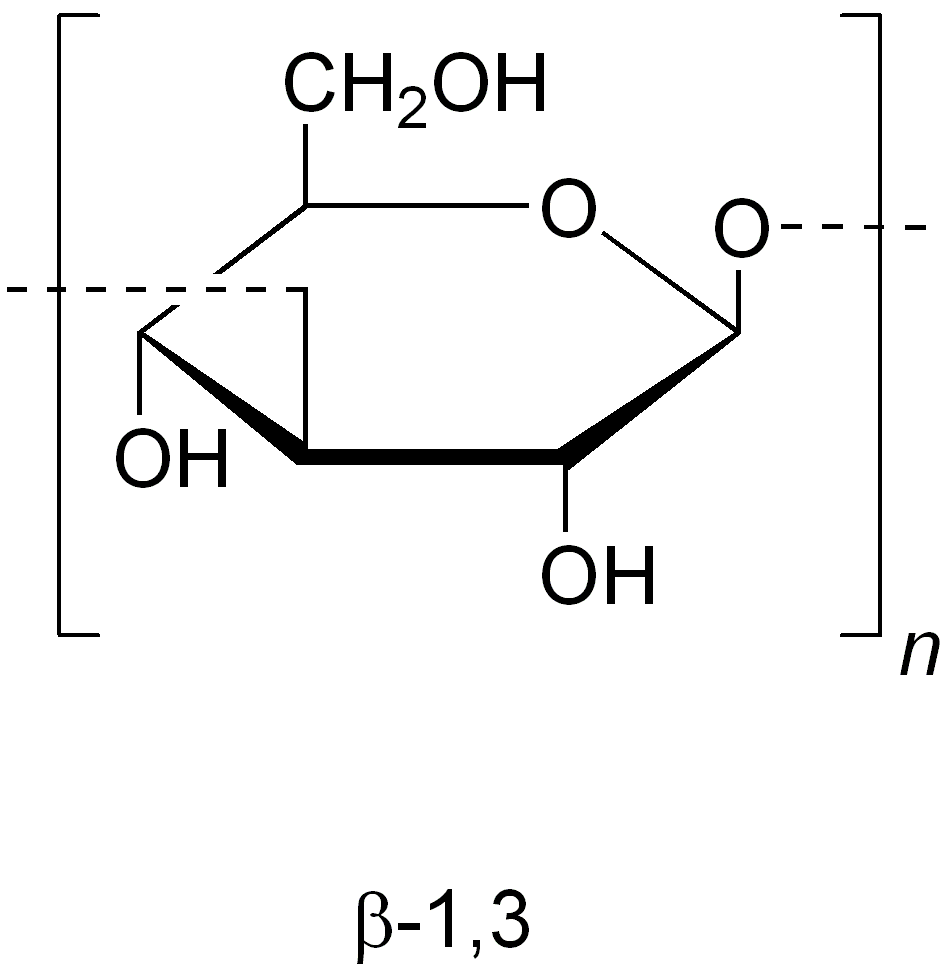

Identifiers
CAS Number	9010-72-4
ChemSpider	none
ECHA InfoCard	100.029.737
CompTox Dashboard (EPA)	DTXSID9042540

Properties
Chemical formula	(C_{6}H_{10}O_{5})_{x}
Molar mass	Variable
- Except where otherwise noted, data are given for materials in their standard state (at 25 °C [77 °F], 100 kPa). verify (what is ?) Infobox references

Zymosan is a beta-glucan with repeating glucose units connected by β-1,3-glycosidic linkages. It binds to TLR 2 and Dectin-1 (CLEC7A). Zymosan is a ligand found on the surface of fungi, like yeast.

Zymosan is prepared from yeast cell walls and consists of protein-carbohydrate complexes. It is used to induce experimental sterile inflammation. In macrophages, zymosan-induced responses include the induction of proinflammatory cytokines, arachidonate mobilization, protein phosphorylation, and inositol phosphate formation. Zymosan A also raises cyclin D2 levels, suggesting a role for the latter in macrophage activation besides proliferation. It potentiates acute liver damage after galactosamine injection, suggesting that certain types of nonparenchymal cells other than Kupffer cells are involved in zymosan action.
