= Lipoteichoic acid =

Group of chemical compounds

Lipoteichoic acid (LTA) is a major constituent of the cell wall of gram-positive bacteria. These organisms have an inner (or cytoplasmic) membrane and, external to it, a thick (up to 80 nanometer) peptidoglycan layer. The structure of LTA varies between the different species of gram-positive bacteria and may contain long chains of ribitol or glycerol phosphate. LTA is anchored to the cell membrane via a diacylglycerol. It acts as regulator of autolytic wall enzymes (muramidases). It has antigenic properties being able to stimulate specific immune response.

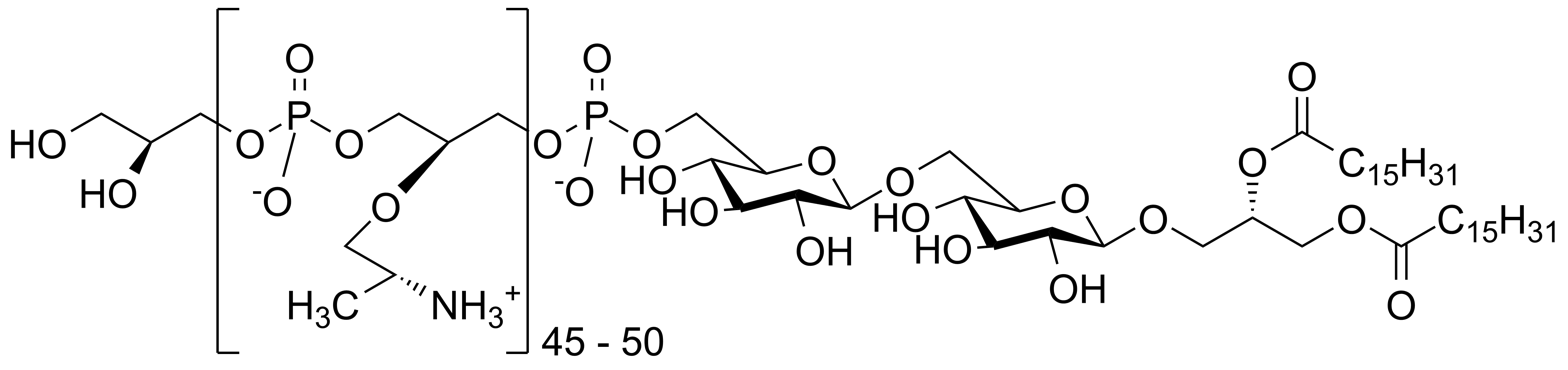
Structure of the lipoteichoic acid polymer

LTA may bind to target cells non-specifically through membrane phospholipids, or specifically to CD14 and to Toll-like receptors. Binding to TLR-2 has shown to induce NF-κB expression(a central transcription factor), elevating expression of both pro- and anti-apoptotic genes. Its activation also induces mitogen-activated protein kinases (MAPK) activation along with phosphoinositide 3-kinase activation.

== Studies ==
Gram-positive and -negative cell walls

LTA's molecular structure has been found to have the strongest hydrophobic bonds of an entire bacteria.

Said et al. showed that LTA causes an IL-10-dependent inhibition of CD4 T-cell expansion and function by up-regulating PD-1 levels on monocytes which leads to IL-10 production by monocytes after binding of PD-1 by PD-L.

Lipoteichoic acid (LTA) from Gram-positive bacteria exerts different immune effects depending on the bacterial source from which it is isolated. For example, LTA from Enterococcus faecalis is a virulence factor positively correlating to inflammatory damage to teeth during acute infection. On the other hand, a study reported Lacticaseibacillus rhamnosus GG LTA (LGG-LTA) oral administration reduces UVB-induced immunosuppression and skin tumor development in mice. In animal studies, specific bacterial LTA has been correlated with induction of arthritis, nephritis, uveitis, encephalomyelitis, meningeal inflammation, and periodontal lesions, and also triggered cascades resulting in septic shock and multiorgan failure.
