= Periodic fever syndrome =

- Other names: Autoinflammatory diseases or Autoinflammatory syndromes
- Specialty: Rheumatology, Immunology

Periodic fever syndromes are a set of disorders characterized by recurrent episodes of systemic and organ-specific inflammation. Unlike autoimmune disorders such as systemic lupus erythematosus, in which the disease is caused by abnormalities of the adaptive immune system, people with autoinflammatory diseases do not produce autoantibodies or antigen-specific T or B cells. Instead, the autoinflammatory diseases are characterized by errors in the innate immune system.

The syndromes are diverse, but tend to cause episodes of fever, joint pains, skin rashes, abdominal pains and may lead to chronic complications such as amyloidosis.

Most autoinflammatory diseases are genetic and present during childhood. The most common genetic autoinflammatory syndrome is familial Mediterranean fever, which causes short episodes of fever, abdominal pain, serositis, lasting less than 72 hours. It is caused by mutations in the MEFV gene, which codes for the protein pyrin.

Pyrin is a protein normally present in the inflammasome. The mutated pyrin protein is thought to cause inappropriate activation of the inflammasome, leading to release of the pro-inflammatory cytokine IL-1β. Most other autoinflammatory diseases also cause disease by inappropriate release of IL-1β. Thus, IL-1β has become a common therapeutic target, and medications such as anakinra, rilonacept, and canakinumab have revolutionized the treatment of autoinflammatory diseases.

However, there are some autoinflammatory diseases that are not known to have a clear genetic cause. This includes PFAPA, which is the most common autoinflammatory disease seen in children, characterized by episodes of fever, aphthous stomatitis, pharyngitis, and cervical adenitis. Other autoinflammatory diseases that do not have clear genetic causes include adult-onset Still's disease, systemic-onset juvenile idiopathic arthritis, Schnitzler syndrome, and chronic recurrent multifocal osteomyelitis. It is likely that these diseases are multifactorial, with genes that make people susceptible to these diseases, but they require an additional environmental factor to trigger the disease.

== Individual periodic fever syndromes ==
Name	OMIM	Gene
Familial Mediterranean fever (FMF)	249100	MEFV
Hyperimmunoglobulinemia D with recurrent fever (HIDS). This is now (along with mevalonic aciduria) defined as a mevalonate kinase deficiency	260920	MVK
TNF receptor associated periodic syndrome (TRAPS)	142680	TNFRSF1A
CAPS: Muckle–Wells syndrome (urticaria deafness amyloidosis)	191900	NLRP3
CAPS: Familial cold urticaria	120100	NLRP3
CAPS: Neonatal onset multisystem inflammatory disease (NOMID)	607115	NLRP3
Periodic fever, aphthous stomatitis, pharyngitis and adenitis (PFAPA syndrome)	none	?
Blau syndrome	186580	NOD2
Pyogenic sterile arthritis, pyoderma gangrenosum, acne (PAPA)	604416	PSTPIP1
Deficiency of the interleukin-1–receptor antagonist (DIRA)	612852	IL1RN
Yao syndrome (YAOS)	617321	NOD2
Retinal dystrophy, optic nerve edema, splenomegaly, anhidrosis, and headache syndrome (ROSAH syndrome)	614979	ALPK1

== See also ==
- Kawasaki disease - possible autoinflammatory mechanism
- Multisystem inflammatory syndrome in children
- List of cutaneous conditions
