= Anakinra =

Pharmaceutical drug

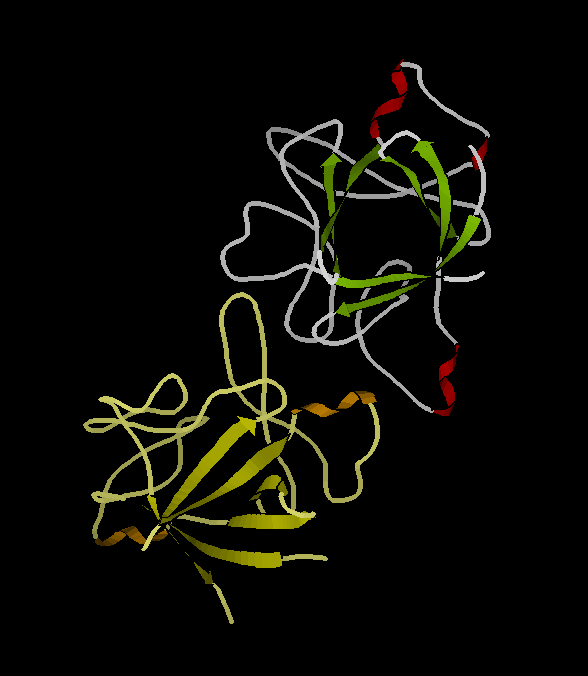

Clinical data
- Trade names: Kineret
- AHFS/Drugs.com: Monograph
- MedlinePlus: a602001
- License data: US DailyMed: Anakinra
- Pregnancy category: AU: B1
- Routes of administration: Subcutaneous
- ATC code: L04AC03 (WHO)

Legal status
- Legal status: AU: S4 (Prescription only); CA: ℞-only; UK: POM (Prescription only); US: ℞-only; EU: Rx-only

Pharmacokinetic data
- Bioavailability: 95%
- Metabolism: predominantly kidney
- Elimination half-life: 4-6 hrs

Identifiers
- IUPAC name: Recombinant human Interleukin-1 receptor antagonist protein; syn. N2-l-methionyl-interleukin 1 receptor antagonist (human isoform x reduced)
- CAS Number: 143090-92-0
- DrugBank: DB00026
- ChemSpider: none
- UNII: 9013DUQ28K
- KEGG: D02934
- ChEMBL: ChEMBL1201570

Chemical and physical data
- Formula: C_{759}H_{1186}N_{208}O_{232}S_{10}
- Molar mass: 17257.66 g·mol^{−1}

Anakinra, sold under the brand name Kineret, is a biopharmaceutical medication used to treat rheumatoid arthritis, cryopyrin-associated periodic syndromes, familial Mediterranean fever, and Still's disease. It is a slightly modified recombinant version of the human interleukin 1 receptor antagonist protein. It is marketed by Swedish Orphan Biovitrum. Anakinra is administered by subcutaneous injection.

== Medical uses ==
It is used as a second line treatment to manage symptoms of rheumatoid arthritis after treatment with a disease-modifying antirheumatic drug (DMARD) has failed. It can be used in combination with some DMARDs.

It is administered subcutaneously to patients diagnosed with a cryopyrin-associated periodic syndrome, including neonatal-onset multisystem inflammatory disease.

It is used to treat Schnitzler's syndrome (off label in the US). Its response rate is such that it has been suggested that "Treatment failures should lead to reconsider the diagnosis."

Off label, it is used to treat systemic juvenile idiopathic arthritis (SJIA), gout, calcium pyrophosphate deposition (CPPD), Behçet's disease, ankylosing spondylitis, uveitis, and other auto-inflammatory syndromes.

In December 2021, the European Medicines Agency authorized the use of anakinra "to treat COVID-19 in adults with pneumonia requiring supplemental oxygen (low or high flow oxygen) and who are at risk of developing severe respiratory failure, as determined by blood levels of a protein called suPAR (soluble urokinase plasminogen activator receptor) of at least 6 ng per ml." In November 2022, the United States FDA approved its use under an emergency use authorization "for the treatment of COVID-19 in hospitalized adults with pneumonia requiring supplemental oxygen (low- or high-flow oxygen) who are at risk of progressing to severe respiratory failure and likely to have an elevated plasma soluble urokinase plasminogen activator receptor (suPAR)."

Anakinra can be used as a final pharmacological treatment for refractory recurrent pericarditis. Along with other IL-1 inhibitors canakinumab (Ilaris) and rilonacept (Arcalyst), and IL-6 inhibitor tocilizumab (Actemra), anakinra can be considered as a treatment for refractory pericarditis after other treatments have failed. First-line treatments include NSAIDs such as ibuprofen, diclofenac, and aspirin, and the anti-inflammatory drug colchicine. Second-line treatments include corticosteroids such as prednisone, prednisolone, and dexamethasone, or DMARDs such as methotrexate and azathioprine. Anakinra is particularly useful when corticosteroids have failed, or in steroid-dependent pericarditis. If anakinra, canakinumab, rilonacept, or tocilizumab fail, intravenous immunoglobulins can be considered, or radical pericardiectomy especially in cases of constrictive pericarditis.

== Safety ==
It was not tested in pregnant women, but appeared to be safe in animal studies.

It should not be used in people who have active infections or latent tuberculosis, or who are taking TNF inhibitors.

== Adverse reactions ==
More than ten percent of people taking Anakinra have injection site reactions, headaches, and have increased cholesterol levels. Recipients have eight percent more patients decrease white blood cells counts, two percent more patients decrease platelets counts, one percent more patients get severe infections (4.5% for patients with asthma compared to 0% placebo patients with asthma). It is unclear if taking Anakinra increases cancer risk; studies are complicated by the fact that people with rheumatoid arthritis already face higher cancer risk.

== Chemistry ==
Anakinra differs from the sequence of Interleukin 1 receptor antagonist by one methionine amino acid added to its N-terminus; it also differs from the human protein in that it is not glycosylated, as it is manufactured in Escherichia coli.

== History ==
It was approved for medical use in the US in 2001, and in the European Union in 2002.

In 2018, NHS England published a Clinical Commissioning Policy: Anakinra to treat periodic fevers and autoinflammatory disorders (all ages) allowing Anakinra to be commissioned as a first-line treatment for Schnitzler's syndrome and in cases where the first-line treatment is not effective for Familial Mediterranean fever, Hyper-IgD syndrome also known as Mevalonate kinase deficiency, and TNF receptor associated periodic syndrome (TRAPS), and a Clinical Commissioning Policy: Anakinra/tocilizumab for the treatment of Adult-Onset Still's Disease refractory to second-line therapy (adults), allowing Anakinra to be commissioned for adult-onset Still's disease "as a third line treatment where patients are refractory to steroid-sparing effect DMARDs".

In December 2020, Anakinra was approved by the US Food and Drug Administration for the treatment of deficiency of the interleukin-1–receptor antagonist (DIRA), a rare autoinflammatory disease of infancy. In 2021, it was announced that the Ministry of Health of the Russian Federation had approved the use of Anakinra for the treatment of CAPS.

In October 2021, NHS England published Clinical Commissioning Policy: Anakinra for Haemophagocytic Lymphohistiocytosis (HLH) for adults and children in all ages, allowing Anakinra to be used in the treatment of HLH.

== Society and culture ==
=== Legal status ===
Approvals
	Condition								
Country	RA	CAPS	FMF	AOSD	Schnitzler's	MKD	TRAPS	DIRA	HLH
US	2001							2020	
UK				2018	2018	2018	2018		2021
EU	2002	2002	2002						
Russia		2021							

== Research ==
Anakinra effectively treated meningitis caused by a rare genetic mutation in the gene NALP3 in a 67-year-old man enrolled in the Undiagnosed Diseases Network. Researchers at Johns Hopkins University announced in 2019 that anakinra given to pregnant mice with Zika virus had reduced fetal deaths and birth defects. In November 2019, researchers at the University of Manchester reported that Anakinra might have a use in preventing breast cancer from spreading to the bones.

In 2021, it was reported that Anakinra appeared to reduce the neuropathic pain experienced by patients undergoing chemotherapy with vincristine, saying that "repurposing anakinra may be an effective co-treatment strategy to prevent vincristine-induced peripheral neuropathy".

A review published in 2022 found that "Anakinra appears to show efficacy for numerous dermatologic conditions, with the strongest evidence for hidradenitis suppurativa, Behçet's disease, Muckle–Wells syndrome, and SAPHO syndrome." and concluded that "Overall, anakinra appears to be a promising option in the treatment of numerous dermatologic inflammatory conditions refractory to first line therapies, but further and higher-quality data is needed to clarify its therapeutic role."

In 2023, researchers at Columbia University explored the effect of Anakinra on the ageing of Hematopoietic stem cells in mice. They concluded "that targeting IL-1 as a key mediator of niche inflammation is a tractable strategy to improve blood production during ageing" and were reported to have said "that their findings could pave the way for science to delay aging and even lengthen the lifespan of humans".

A 2023 preliminary study on the use of Anakinra in the treatment of endometriosis concluded that "there is justification for a larger study" and that "Anakinra may be a particularly impactful option for women desiring fertility."

In 2025, a 33-centre study supported by the Patient-Centered Outcomes Research Institute (PCORI) and led by Yale University compared Anakinra with Tocilizumab for the treatment of New-onset refractory status epilepticus (NORSE) and its sub-type Febrile infection-related epilepsy syndrome (FIRES).

A study published in 2026 concluded that "Presepsin-guided Anakinra treatment prevents progression of pneumonia to organ dysfunction and death."

=== COVID-19 ===
Anakinra underwent multiple clinical trials to treat COVID-19 patients, by targeting mechanisms in patients with hyperinflammation. In 2021 a review and meta-analysis of 9 studies involving 1,119 cases concluded that "Available evidence shows that treatment with anakinra reduces both the need for invasive mechanical ventilation and mortality risk of hospitalized non-intubated patients with COVID-19 without increasing the risk of adverse events."

As of July 2021, the European Medicines Agency (EMA) was evaluating an application to extend the use of anakinra to include treatment of COVID-19 in adults with pneumonia who are at risk of developing severe respiratory failure (inability of the lungs to work properly). According to study results published in September 2021 in Nature Medicine, hospitalized COVID-19 patients at increased risk for respiratory failure showed significant improvement after treatment with Anakinra.
