= Schnitzler syndrome =

- Other names: Schnitzler's syndrome
- Specialty: Immunology

Schnitzler syndrome or Schnitzler's syndrome is a rare disease characterised by onset around middle age of chronic hives (urticaria) and periodic fever, bone and joint pain (sometimes with joint inflammation), weight loss, malaise, fatigue, swollen lymph glands and enlarged spleen and liver.

Schnitzler syndrome is considered an autoinflammatory disorder and is generally treated with anakinra, which inhibits interleukin 1. This treatment controls the condition but does not cure it. Around 15% of people develop complications, but the condition generally does not shorten life.

== Classification ==
Schnitzler syndrome is a late-onset autoinflammatory disorder.

== Signs and symptoms ==
The typical onset is at around 55 years old, and the symptoms are recurrent hives, mostly on the torso and limbs, often with recurring fever, joint pain, bone pain, muscle pain, headache, fatigue, and loss of weight.

== Cause ==
As of 2017 the cause of the disease was not understood. A 2024 review by Braud and Lipsker aimed to "describe what is currently known about the pathogenesis of this peculiar disease, as well as to address its diagnosis and management" and concluded that "physiopathology of Schnitzler syndrome remains elusive" and "the main question regarding the relationship between the autoinflammatory features and the monoclonal gammopathy remains to be answered".

== Diagnosis ==
Blood tests show a high concentration of specific gamma-globulins (monoclonal gammopathy) of the IgM type. It almost always has light chains of the κ-type. A variant in which IgG is raised has been described, which appears to be one-tenth as common. The immunoglobulins may show up in the urine as Bence Jones proteins. Signs of inflammation are often present: these include an increased white blood cell count (leukocytosis) and a raised erythrocyte sedimentation rate and C-reactive protein. There can be anemia of chronic disease. Bone abnormalities can be seen on radiological imaging (often increased density or osteosclerosis) or biopsy.

There are two sets of diagnostic criteria, the Lipsker criteria published in 2001 and the Strasbourg criteria that were produced at a meeting in that city in 2012.

The Lipsker criteria require hives, the presence of monoclonal IgM, and at least 2 of the following: fever, joint pain or arthritis, bone pain, swollen lymph nodes, enlarged spleen or liver, elevated erythrocyte sedimentation rate, high levels of white blood cells, and findings of problems in bone imaging.

In the Strasbourg criteria, the person must have hives and the presence of monoclonal IgM or IgG. Schnitzler's is diagnosed if the person has IgM and two of the following, or IgG and three of the following: recurrent fevers, abnormalities in bone imaging, with or without bone pain, findings of neutrophil infiltration in a skin biopsy, high levels of white blood cells or C-reactive protein.

Other conditions which can cause periodic fevers, paraproteins or chronic hives that should be ruled out, include (and are not limited to) autoimmune or autoinflammatory disorders such as adult-onset Still's disease, angioedema, hematological disorders such as lymphoma or monoclonal gammopathy of undetermined significance (MGUS), other causes of hives, cryoglobulinemia, mastocytosis, chronic neonatal onset multisystem inflammatory disease or Muckle–Wells syndrome.

== Treatment ==
As of 2017, no drug was approved to treat Schnitzlers. Drugs that inhibit interleukin 1 activity have been the preferred treatment since they emerged in 2005; since 2012 a consensus guideline has recommended treatment with anakinra. Immunosuppressant drugs such as corticosteroids, cyclooxygenase inhibitors, interferon alpha may be effective. A 2020 review reported that canakinumab was "an effective long-term treatment with a favorable safety profile in patients with Schnitzler syndrome".

In June 2018 NHS England published a Clinical Commissioning Policy: Anakinra to treat periodic fevers and autoinflammatory disorders (all ages) which stated that "Anakinra may be used as a first line treatment in patients with a documented diagnosis of Schnitzler syndrome".

Because anakinra is so highly and rapidly effective for inducing complete remission of Schnitzler syndrome, it has been suggested that in patients who do not respond to anakinra, the diagnosis should be reconsidered. Anakinra is not curative, however; symptoms recur soon after treatment stops.

== Outcomes ==
Generally treatment with anakinra prevents outbreaks but they resume if treatment is stopped. In around 15–20% of people, a lymphoproliferative disorder as a complication, most commonly Waldenström's macroglobulinemia, develops. AA amyloidosis has also been reported in people with Schnitzler syndrome.

The life span in patients with Schnitzler syndrome has not been shown to differ much from the general population.

== Epidemiology ==
It is a rare condition; as of September 2014, 281 cases had been reported and as of 2017 around 300 cases had been reported. In December 2024 it was calculated that 748 cases had been reported worldwide.

== History and name ==
The disease is named after the French dermatologist Liliane Schnitzler who first described this syndrome in 1972. The name Schnitzler's Syndrome was in use by 1989. A Delphi study on the taxonomy and definition of auto-inflammatory diseases, published in 2018, considered the alternative name "late onset gammopathy with recurrent urticaria and fever" (LOGRUF), but this received little support.

== See also ==
- List of skin conditions
