= AA amyloidosis =

- Specialty: Rheumatology

AA amyloidosis is a form of amyloidosis, a disease characterized by the abnormal deposition of fibers of insoluble protein in the extracellular space of various tissues and organs. In AA amyloidosis, the deposited protein is serum amyloid A protein (SAA), an acute-phase protein which is normally soluble and whose plasma concentration is highest during inflammation.

== Causes ==
AA amyloidosis is a complication of a number of inflammatory diseases and infections, although only a small portion of patients with these conditions will go on to develop AA amyloidosis. The most common presentation of AA amyloidosis is renal in nature, including proteinuria, nephrotic syndrome and progressive development of chronic kidney disease leading to end stage kidney disease (ESKD) and need for renal replacement therapy (e.g. dialysis or kidney transplantation). A natural history study of AA amyloidosis patients reported a number of conditions associated with AA amyloidosis:

- Autoimmune diseases and inflammatory diseases
  - Adult-onset Still's disease
  - Ankylosing spondylitis
  - Behcet's disease
  - Crohn's disease and ulcerative colitis
  - Familial Mediterranean fever (FMF)
  - Giant cell arteritis
  - Gout
  - Hyper-IgD syndrome
  - Juvenile idiopathic arthritis
  - Muckle–Wells syndrome (MWS)
  - Neonatal-onset multisystem inflammatory disease
  - Psoriatic arthritis
  - Polyarteritis nodosa
  - Polymyalgia rheumatica
  - Rheumatoid arthritis
  - Sarcoidosis
  - Takayasu's arteritis
  - TNF receptor associated periodic syndrome
- Chronic infections
  - Bronchiectasis
  - Chronic cutaneous ulcers
  - Chronic osteomyelitis
  - Chronic pyelonephritis
  - Hepatitis B
  - Leprosy
  - Tuberculosis
  - Whipple's disease
- Cancer
  - Acute myeloid leukaemia
  - Adenocarcinoma of the gut
  - Basal cell carcinoma of the skin
  - Castleman's disease
  - Chronic myeloid leukaemia
  - Chronic lymphoid leukaemia
  - Follicular dendritic cell sarcoma
  - Gastrointestinal stromal tumours
  - Hairy cell leukaemia
  - Hepatic adenoma
  - Hodgkin's lymphoma
  - Mesothelioma
  - Non-Hodgkin lymphoma
  - Non-small-cell lung cancer
  - Ovarian carcinoma
  - Papillary bladder carcinoma
  - Pleomorphic splenic sarcoma
  - Renal cell carcinoma
  - Small cell carcinoma of the bladder
  - Uterine leiomyosarcoma
  - Waldenstrom's macroglobulinaemia
- Chronic foreign body reaction
- Silicone-induced granulomatous reaction
- Immunodeficiencies
  - Common variable immunodeficiency
  - Cyclic neutropenia
  - HIV/AIDS
  - Hypogammaglobulinaemia
  - X-linked agammaglobulinaemia
- Other conditions predisposing to chronic infections
  - Cystic fibrosis
  - Epidermolysis bullosa
  - IV drug use
  - Jejuno-ileal bypass
  - Paraplegia
- Obesity
- SAPHO syndrome
- Schnitzler syndrome

== Symptoms ==
Signs and symptoms of amyloidosis can vary depending on the affected organ. AA amyloidosis commonly affects kidneys, liver, and stomach.

== Pathology ==
In a healthy individual, the median plasma concentration of SAA is 3 mg per liter. This can increase to over 2000 mg per liter during an acute phase response and a sustained overproduction of SAA is required for the creation of the AA deposits that define AA amyloidosis. High levels of SAA, however, is not a sufficient condition for the development of systemic AA amyloidosis and it remains unclear what triggers the accumulation of AA.

The AA protein is mainly deposited in the liver, spleen and kidney, and AA amyloidosis can lead to nephrotic syndrome and ESRD. Natural history studies show, however, that it is the kidney involvement that drives the progression of the disease. In general, old age, reduced serum albumin concentration, end stage kidney failure, and sustained elevated SAA concentration are all associated with poor prognosis.

== Diagnosis ==
Tissue biopsy using subcutaneous abdominal fat tissue aspiration is typically used as it is safe and sensitive. It is also possible to biopsy the rectal mucosa or minor salivary glands. Amyloidosis is confirmed by histological identification of amyloid deposits. At this point, amyloid typing with immunochemical staining is necessary, as the differential diagnosis includes AA amyloidosis, AL amyloidosis, hereditary amyloidosis, dialysis-related amyloidosis and age-related systemic amyloidosis. Testing of serum and urine for monoclonal immunoglobulins and of serum for free light chains may help rule out immunoglobulin light chain amyloidosis, while genetic testing may be used if hereditary amyloidosis is suspected.

== Treatment ==
There are currently no approved treatments for systemic AA amyloidosis. The current standard of care includes treatments for the underlying inflammatory disease with anti-inflammatory drugs, immunosuppressive agents or biologics. AA amyloidosis patients are also receiving treatments to slow down the decline of their renal function, such as angiotensin II receptor blockers or angiotensin converting enzyme inhibitors.

== Transmission ==
There is evidence that eating amyloid fibers may lead to amyloidosis. This evidence is based on studies in cattle, chickens, mice, and cheetahs. Thus, in a sense, SAA amyloidosis may be considered a contagious disease, although whether this occurs or is important in the development of naturally occurring amyloidosis remains unknown. Nevertheless, because amyloid fibers can be detected in muscle in low amounts, it raises some concern about whether people could develop amyloidosis as a result of ingesting meat from an animal with the disease.
