= Liliane Schnitzler =

French dermatologist (born 1938)

Liliane Schnitzler (born 1938) is a French dermatologist who described the eponymous Schnitzler's syndrome in 1972. Schnitzler's syndrome is a rare autoinflammatory disorder. The disorder was first called Schnitzler's syndrome in 1989.

Schnitzler was born on May 20, 1938. She worked closely with Robert Degos, another French dermatologist. Schnitzler was also a professor, teaching at the CHU Angers, a university hospital in Angers. She became the head of its dermatology department in 1970. She was the first woman to be an associate professor of dermatology at CHU Angers. Schnitzler had retired by 2013.

== Selected publications ==
- Cesarini, Jean-Pierre; Schnitzler, Liliane (1981). La Peau. Que sais-je?. Paris: Presses Universitaires de France. ISBN 2-13-036831-X.
- Schnitzler, L. "Lésions urticariennes chroniques permanentes (érythème pétaloïde?)". Cas cliniques no 46B. Journée Dermatologique d'Angers 1972. (First description of Schnitzler's syndrome)
- Schnitzler, L; Schubert, B; Boasson, M; Gardais, J; Tourmen, A (1974). "Urticaire chronique, lésions osseuses, macroglobulinémie IgM: maladie de Waldenström? 2ème présentation". Bulletin de la Société française de dermatologie et de syphiligraphie. 81: 363–364.
- Schnitzler, L; Verret, J-L. (2002). "La dermatologie à Angers". In Wallach, David; Tilles, Gérard (eds.). La dermatologie en France. pp. 525–531.
