= C4H7NO2S =

The molecular formula C_{4}H_{7}NO_{2}S may refer to:

- Dapansutrile
- Thioproline
