= Deficiency of the interleukin-1–receptor antagonist =

- Other names: Interleukin 1 receptor antagonist deficiency
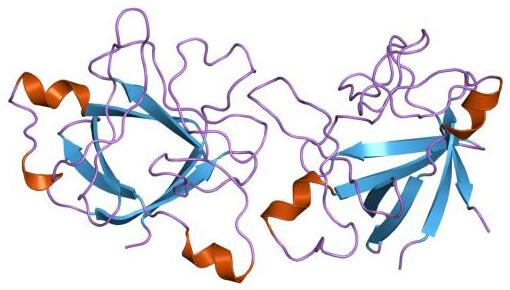
- Interleukin-1–receptor antagonist
- Specialty: Immunology
- Symptoms: Joint pain
- Causes: Mutations in IL1RN gene
- Diagnostic method: Genetic test, Radiological findings
- Treatment: Colchicine

Deficiency of the interleukin-1–receptor antagonist (DIRA) is an autosomal recessive, genetic autoinflammatory syndrome resulting from mutations in IL1RN, the gene encoding the interleukin 1 receptor antagonist.

== Symptoms and signs ==
Cervical vertebrae

DIRA displays a constellation of serious symptoms which include respiratory distress, as well as the following:

- Joint swelling
- Hepatomegaly
- Osteomyelitis
- Fused cervical vertebrae
- Interstitial pulmonary abnormality
- Stomatitis
- Mouth ulcers
- Pustulosis or pustular psoriasis
- Cerebral vasculitis

== Cause ==
Those affected with DIRA have inherited (via autosomal recessive manner) mutations in IL1RN, a gene that encodes a protein known as interleukin 1 receptor antagonist, The cytogenetic location of IL1RN is 2q14.1, while its 2:113,099,364-113,134,015 are the genomic coordinates.

== Mechanism ==
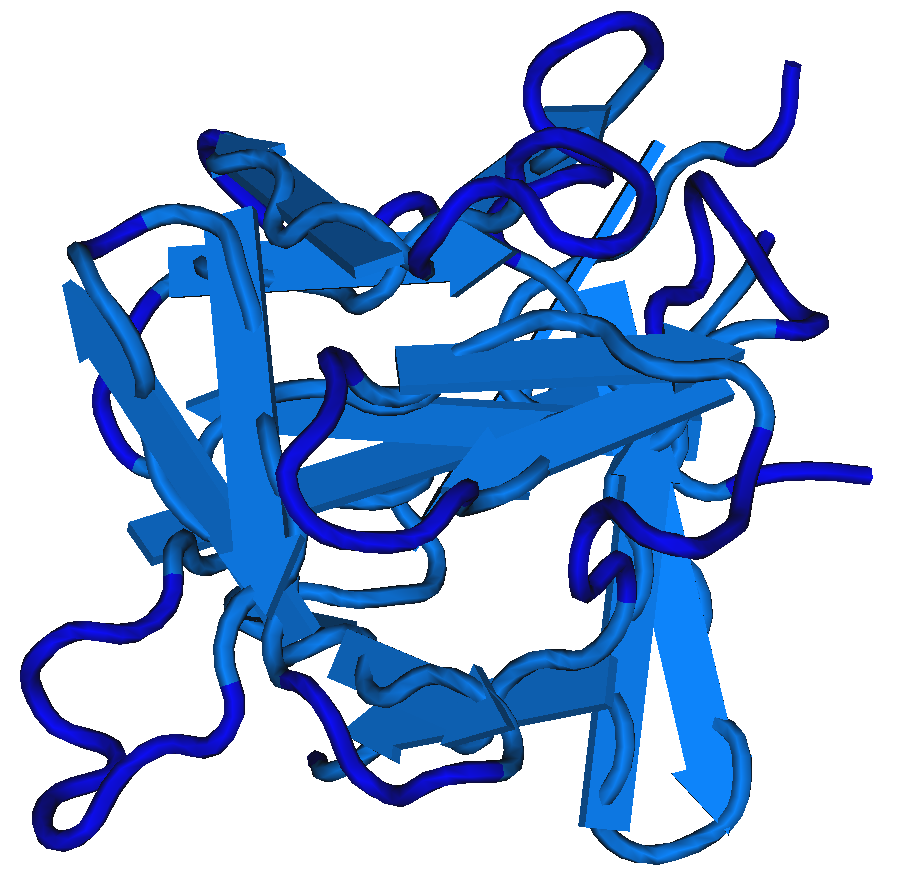
Interleukin-1Alpha

The mechanism of deficiency of the interleukin-1–receptor antagonist affects the normal function of IL1RN gene. The protein produced by IL1RN gene prevents the normal activities of interleukin 1(alpha) and interleukin 1(beta). Therefore, the pathophysiologic immune and inflammatory responses are nullified. Interleukin 1 receptor antagonist (IL1RN) has a total of five alleles, of those the (IL1RN*1) and (IL1RN*2) are the most common as the other alleles are seen less than 5 percent.

IL-1RN binds to the same cell receptors as the inflammatory protein IL-1, and blocks its inflammatory actions. Without IL-1Ra, the body cannot control systemic inflammation that can be caused by IL-1.

== Diagnosis ==
Those affected with deficiency of the interleukin-1–receptor antagonist can have diagnosis achieved via noting an increase of erythrocyte sedimentation rate, as well as the following:

- Genetic test
- Radiological findings
- Clinical findings

== Treatment ==
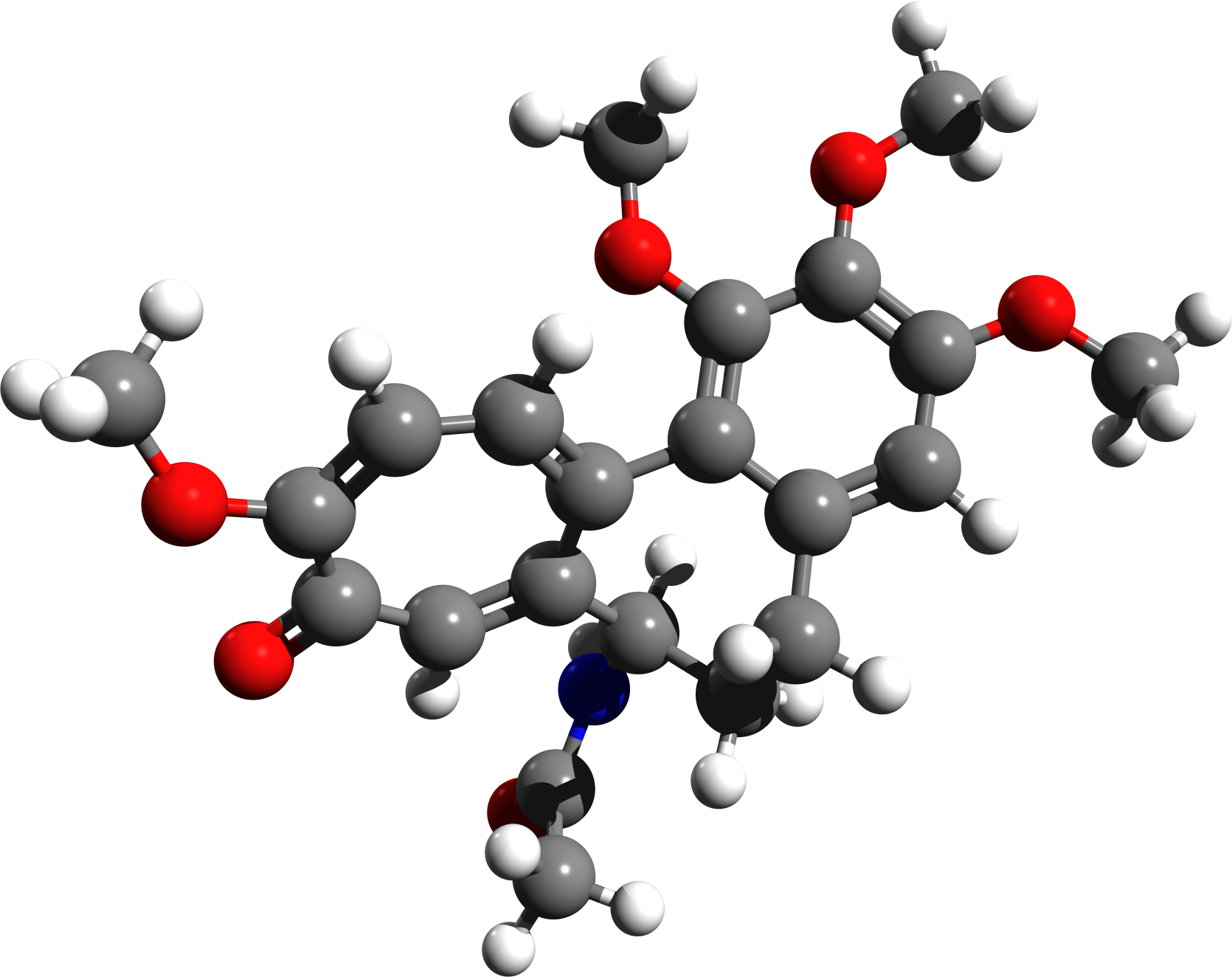
Colchicine

In terms of treatment a 2013 review indicates that colchicine can be used for DIRA. Additionally there are several other management options such as anakinra, which blocks naturally occurring IL-1.

== See also ==
- Neonatal onset multisystem inflammatory disease (NOMID)
