= Ruvonoflast =

Investigational drug

Clinical data
- Other names: NT-0796

Identifiers
- IUPAC name: propan-2-yl (2R)-2-(1,2,3,5,6,7-hexahydro-s-indacen-4-ylcarbamoyloxy)-3-pyrimidin-2-ylpropanoate
- CAS Number: 2272917-13-0
- PubChem CID: 152031485
- ChemSpider: 129309203
- UNII: S7V5RX5WBZ
- ChEMBL: ChEMBL5409389

Chemical and physical data
- Formula: C_{23}H_{27}N_{3}O_{4}
- Molar mass: 409.486 g·mol^{−1}
- 3D model (JSmol): Interactive image
- SMILES: CC(C)OC(=O)[C@@H](CC1=NC=CC=N1)OC(=O)NC2=C3CCCC3=CC4=C2CCC4
- InChI: InChI=InChI=1S/C23H27N3O4/c1-14(2)29-22(27)19(13-20-24-10-5-11-25-20)30-23(28)26-21-17-8-3-6-15(17)12-16-7-4-9-18(16)21/h5,10-12,14,19H,3-4,6-9,13H2,1-2H3,(H,26,28)/t19-/m1/s1; Key:UMUQEMHROZVOTF-LJQANCHMSA-N

Ruvonoflast is an investigational new drug that is being evaluated by Nodthera for the treatment of obesity in patients with high cardiovascular risk. It is an NLRP3 inflammasome inhibitor.
