= Muckle–Wells syndrome =

- Other names: Urticaria-deafness-amyloidosis syndrome (UDA),
- This condition is inherited in an autosomal dominant manner
- Specialty: Clinical Immunology
- Differential diagnosis: Behçet's disease, Familial Mediterranean fever, TNF receptor associated periodic syndrome, Mevalonate kinase deficiency

Muckle–Wells syndrome (MWS) is a rare autosomal dominant disease which causes sensorineural deafness and recurrent hives, and can lead to amyloidosis. Individuals with MWS often have episodic fever, chills, and joint pain. As a result, MWS is considered a type of periodic fever syndrome. MWS is caused by a defect in the CIAS1 gene which creates the protein cryopyrin. MWS is closely related to two other syndromes, familial cold urticaria and neonatal onset multisystem inflammatory disease—in fact, all three are related to mutations in the same gene and subsumed under the term cryopyrin-associated periodic syndromes (CAPS).

== Sign and symptoms ==
- Sensorineural deafness
- Recurrent urticaria (hives)
- Fevers
- Chills
- Arthralgia (painful joints)

== Causes ==
Muckle-Wells syndrome occurs when a mutation in the NLRP3 gene leads to increased activity of the protein NLRP3 (cryopyrin). This protein is partly responsible for the body's response to damage or infection. During these states, a cytokine called interleukin 1β is produced by an innate immune cell known as a macrophage. This cytokine interacts with a receptor on the surface of other immune cells to produce symptoms of inflammation such as fever, arthritis, and malaise. Increased activity of cryopyrin leads to an increase in interleukin 1β, which in turn leads to inflammation all throughout the body with the associated symptoms.

== Diagnosis ==
Diagnosis is based on symptoms and can be confirmed via genetic testing. However, not all patients have a mutation with the CIAS1 or NLRP3 gene.

== Treatment ==
- Treatment with anakinra, an interleukin 1 receptor antagonist, can lead to an improvement in the hearing loss.
- Rilonacept (Arcalyst) a dimeric fusion protein for the treatment of CAPS.
- Canakinumab, a monoclonal antibody against interleukin-1β

== Prognosis ==
The chronic inflammation present in MWS over time can lead to sensorineural hearing loss. In addition, the prolonged inflammation can lead to deposition of proteins in the kidney, a condition known as amyloidosis.

== History ==
MWS was first described in 1962 by Thomas James Muckle (1938–2014) and Michael Vernon Wells (born 1932).

== Society and culture ==
The CBC Radio One program, White Coat, Black Art, hosted by Dr. Brian Goldman, presents a real-life study of the self-diagnosis by and successful treatment of a father and daughter with Muckle–Wells syndrome.

In the episode of popular TV series House, the main patient of the Season 7 episode Recession Proof is ultimately diagnosed with this condition. In an episode of TV series Cake Boss, Buddy Valastro works with a girl with this condition through Make-A-Wish Foundation.

== See also ==
- Familial cold urticaria, a similar disease
- List of cutaneous conditions
- NOMID, a similar disease
- Urticarial syndromes
- CINCA Syndrome
