= Dapansutrile =

Names
- Preferred IUPAC name 3-(Methanesulfonyl)propanenitrile

Identifiers
CAS Number	54863-37-5
3D model (JSmol)	Interactive image
ChEMBL	ChEMBL3989943
ChemSpider	14967771
DrugBank	DB16130
ECHA InfoCard	100.255.888
EC Number	821-352-9
IUPHAR/BPS	10056
KEGG	D10920
PubChem CID	12714644
UNII	2Z03364G96
CompTox Dashboard (EPA)	DTXSID601336541
- InChI: InChI=1S/C4H7NO2S/c1-8(6,7)4-2-3-5/h2,4H2,1H3 Key: LQFRYKBDZNPJSW-UHFFFAOYSA-N
- SMILES: CS(=O)(=O)CCC#N

Properties
Chemical formula	C_{4}H_{7}NO_{2}S
Molar mass	133.17 g·mol^{−1}

Hazards
- GHS labelling
Pictograms	(GHS07: Exclamation mark)
Signal word	Warning
Hazard statements	H302, H315, H319, H335
Precautionary statements	P261, P264, P270, P271, P280, P301+P312, P302+P352, P304+P340, P305+P351+P338, P312, P321, P330, P332+P313, P337+P313, P362, P403+P233, P405, P501
- Except where otherwise noted, data are given for materials in their standard state (at 25 °C [77 °F], 100 kPa). Infobox references

Dapansutrile (OLT1177) is an inhibitor of the NLRP3 (nucleotide-binding domain leucine-rich repeat and pyrin domain containing receptor 3) inflammasome.

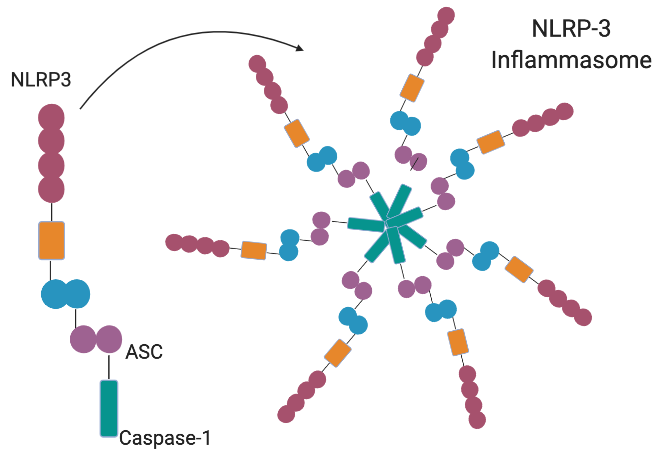
Figure 1. NLRP3 protein domains and multiple NLRP3 form the NLRP3 Inflammasome. The NLRP3 protein is composed of three domains: NOD-, LRR-, and pyrin domain-containing protein 3 (NLRP3), the apoptosis speck-like protein (ASC), and caspase-1.

An inflammasome can be defined as an immune system receptor that induces inflammation through the activation of caspase 1 and caspase 11 when it is triggered by damaged cells, microbial pathogens, and stress. NLRP3 is a canonical inflammasome. The NLRP3 inflammasome comprises NLRP3, the apoptosis spec-like protein (ASC) and the caspase-1 (Figure 1). The NLRP3 inflammasome forms by binding to pattern recognition receptors (PRRs) and damage associated molecular patterns damage-associated molecular patterns (DAMPS) that activate caspase 1 which then signals for the secretion of pro-inflammatory cytokines IL-1β and IL-18 resulting in pyroptosis Constant activation of the NLRP3 inflammasome is believed to play a direct or indirect role in acute arthritis, atherosclerosis and various neurodegenerative diseases such as multiple sclerosis (MS), Alzheimer's disease (AD), and Parkinson's disease (PD). This drug was developed by Olatec Therapeutics with the purpose of decreasing IL-1β peripheral inflammation by binding to the NLRP3 protein and inhibiting the formation of the NLRP3 inflammasome. Interestingly, dapansutrile has also been found to reduce levels of pro inflammatory cytokines IL-18 without interfering with TNF-α levels. Stressed cells in the system can ignite the NLRP3 inflammasome which in turn produces the secretion inflammatory cytokines such as IL-1β and IL-18. Dapansutrile has tested in clinical trials and has been proposed as a beneficial compound for the remedy of osteoarthritis, and gouty arthritis. Nevertheless, other preclinical research has proposed dapansutrile to be potentially beneficial for heart failure and multiple sclerosis.

== Molecular structure and properties ==
Dapansutrile is a β-sulfonyl nitrile compound with four carbon, seven hydrogen, one nitrogen, two oxygen, and one sulfur atom. The molecular formula of this compound is C_{4}H_{7}NO_{2}S, and it carries a molecular weight of 133.7 g/mol. Synonyms of dapansutrile include OLT1177 and 3-(methylsulfonyl)propanenitrile.

== Synthesis ==
OLT1177 is synthesized by alkylation of sodium methanesulfinate with 3-bromopropionitrile. This reaction produces crude methylsulfonylpropionitrile which is then purified through dissolution into acetone, filtration of the sodium bromide bi-product, solvent exchange via distillation, and recrystallization from ethanol.

== Dapansutrile's mechanism of action ==
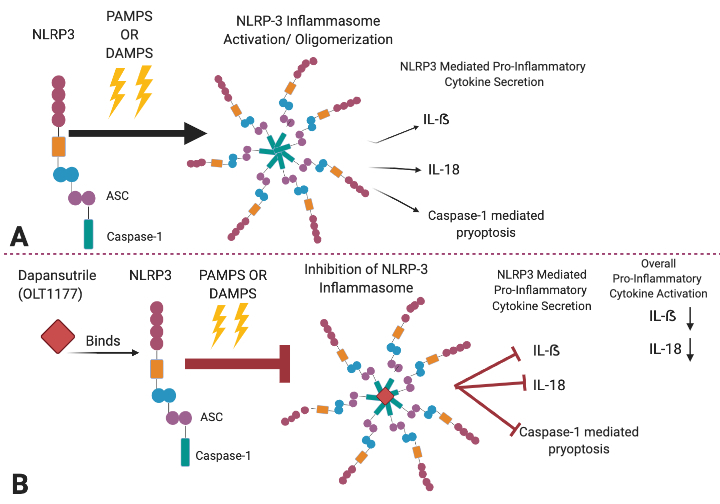
Figure 3. Dapansutrile's mechanism of action. A. Depicts the activation and oligomerization of the NLRP3 inflammasome caused by PAMPS and DAMPS. B. When dapansutrile is administered it binds to the NLRP3 protein and if DAMPS and PAMPS signals are present, dapansutrile will inhibit NLRP3 inflammasome activation. This leads to an inhibition of the NLRP3 secretion of cytokines (IL-1β and IL-18) and caspase-1 mediated pyroptosis.

== Dapansutrile's reaction pathways ==
Dapansutrile denoted as a β-sulfonyl nitrile molecule. Its mechanism of action induces a Pinner reaction which is initiated by reacting with thiols, alcohols and amines. Thus, leading to the formation of thiomidates, imidates and amidines respectively. The nitrile group of OLT1177 is still not denoted as a covalent, noncovalent, irreversible or non-reversible inhibitor as there are currently no studies about its reactivity. Nevertheless, some researchers believe that dapansutrile promotes inhibition of NLRP3 through covalent bonds.

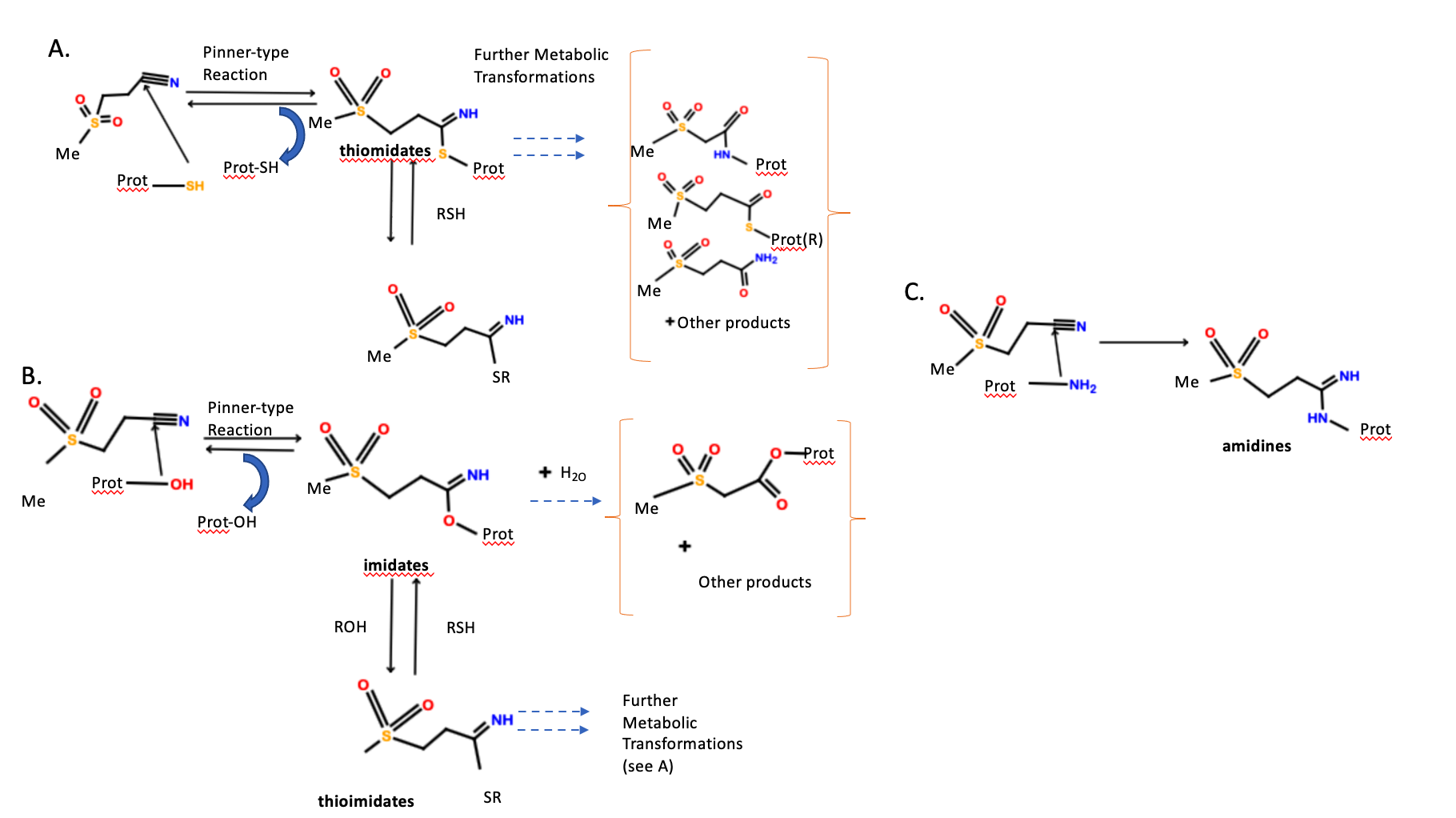
Dapansutrile mechanism of action. A. Reaction pathway with sulfur. B. Reaction pathway with oxygen. C. Reaction pathway with nitrogen.

== Summary biological effects of dapansutrile ==
Reversible or Non-Reversible	Not Known
Primary Mechanism of Action	Inhibits: ATPase of NLRP3; NLRP3-ASC; NLRP3 caspase-1 interactions; NLRP3 assembly
Selectivity	Selective to NLRP3 inflammasome
IL-1β inhibition % (μM)	60% (0.0001–10 μM)
NLRP3 ATPase inhibition % (μM)	60% (1 μM)
Pyroptosis Inhibition % (μM)	25–40% (0.001–10 μM)
Other Targets	Src; Fyn; HcK; STAT3; NF-κB
Cytotoxicity Tc_{50 ±} SE (μM)	Nontoxic in healthy volunteers (up to 1 gram a day for 8 days in oral form)
References	

== Pharmacokinetics ==
=== Selectivity ===
Dapansutrile targets the inhibition of the NLRP3 ATPase and thus blocks the activation of the inflammasome's ASC, and caspase-1 interaction; thereby preventing the assembly of the inflammasome and inflammatory signals such as IL-1β and IL-18. This drug also inhibits pyroptosis. Nevertheless, the drug does not impact the mRNA levels of the NLRP3, ASC, caspase-1, IL-1β, and IL-18 genes.

Research of dapansutrile presents that the compound solely inhibits the NLRP3 inflammasome. Murine macrophages were used and stimulated with lipopolysaccharides and either flagellin or the dsDNA analog Poly(dA:dT) to activate inflammasomes such as NLRC4 and AIM 2 respectively. When Dapansutrile was added they found no difference in the release of TNF-α and IL-1β cytokines to when these inflammasomes were activated.

=== Other drug targets ===
Other known targets of dapansutrile include several phosphorylated kinases such as Src; Fyn; HcK; STAT3. Human monocyte derived macrophages (HMDM) cells were stimulated with lipopolysaccharide, and nigericin. Dapansutrile was then added and they found a 26%, 35%, 43% and 33% reduction of these phosphorylated kinases respectively.

=== Dosages ===
In vitro: Human derived macrophages were cultured to study the effect of dapansutrile cytokine production. It was found that dapansutrile at a 1 μM dose inhibited secretion of IL-1β by 60%, and IL-18 levels by 70%. The drug was also found to selectively inhibit pyroptosis at 10 μM.

In vivo: A phase one clinical trial of 35 subjects was conducted to establish the safety of dapansutrile. The daily mean plasma concentration maximum (C_{max}) for a single oral dose of dapansutrile was 2,700 ng/mL for the 100-mg dose, 9,800 ng/mL for the 300 mg dose and 32,00 ng/mL for the 1,000 mg dose (Figure 5). Dapansutrile was also studied if given repeatedly once per day for 8 days with a dose of either 100 mg, and 300 mg, or 1,000 mg. The subjects mean plasma concentration on day 8 were 4,800 ng/mL for the 100 mg dose, 15,800 ng/mL for the 300 mg dose and 41,400 ng/mL for the 1,000 mg dose.

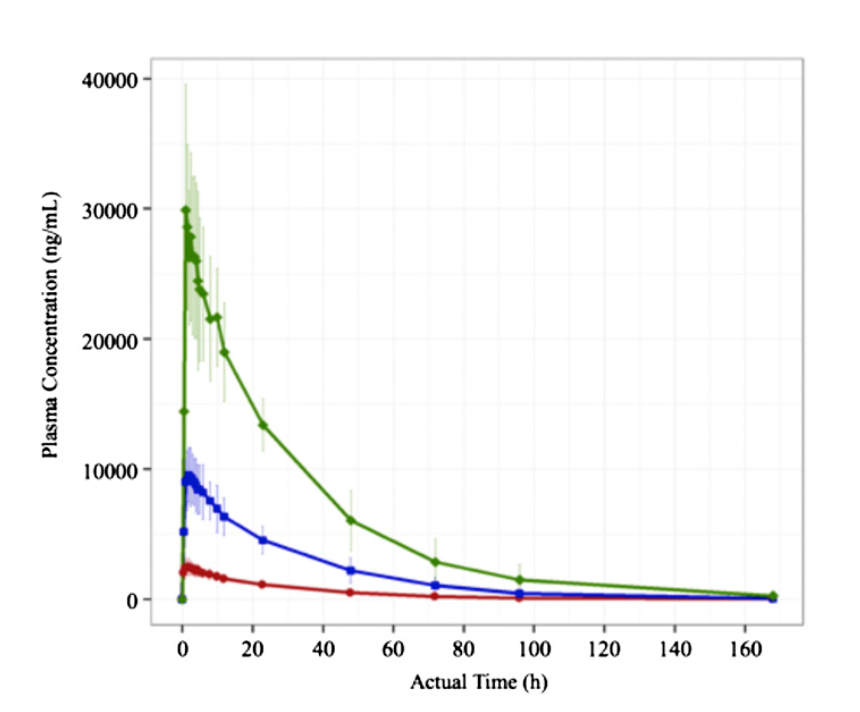
Figure 5. Plasma Concentration after a Single Oral Dose of OLT1177 versus Time. Plasma concentration for a single dose of OLT1177: 100 mg of OLT1177 (red), 300 mg (blue), 1,000 mg (green). Reposted with permission.

Dapansutrile (OLT1177) Pharmacokinetics (PK) after Single Oral Dose
Mean PK Characteristic (units)	100 mg N=5	300 mg N=5	1000 mg N=5
AUC_{0-t} (h*ng/ml)	76457.07	324650.71	918963.5
AUC_{0-24} (h*ng/ml)	40121.19	157378.19	461809.56
Residual Area %	0.71	0.74	1.12
C_{max} (ng/ml)	2,700	9,800	32,000
T_{1/2 el}(h)	23.01	22.8	24.15
K_{el} (h)	0.0309	0.0317	0.0307
Cl/F (L/h) i.e. oral clearance	1.32	0.97	1.11
V_{d}/F (L)	43.95	31.86	37.63

Dapansutrile (OLT1177) Pharmacokinetics (PK) after Multiple Oral Dose (8 days)
Mean PK Characteristic (units)	N	100 mg N=5	N	300 mg	N	1000 mg
AUC_{0-τ} (h*ng/ml)	5	70288.75	3	260409.24	5	7231127.44
C_{max} (ng/ml)	5	4,800	4	15,800	5	41,400
C_{min}(ng/ml)	5	1,710	4	6,820	5	18,700
C_{ave}(ng/ml)	5	2,930	3	10,900	5	30,100
T_{1/2 el}(h)	5	16.01	3	21.34	5	24.72
Cl_{ss}/F(L/h)	5	1.47	3	1.17	5	1.49
V_{d}/F (L)	5	35.22	3	36.19	5	48.56

== Pharmacodynamics ==
=== Safety and efficacy ===
In the Marchetti et al. study, seven of the 35 subjects reported adverse events. Five of the cases were in the single dose study while two cases were in the multi-regimen group. However, the adverse effects were considered unrelated to dapansutrile. Subjects presented no changes in blood pressure (systolic and diastolic), urinalysis, heart rate, liver function enzymes or acute phase proteins in the cohort after an 8-day trial with up to daily 1,000 mg dosing of dapansutrile.

Adverse Events
Single Dose Administration of OLT1177		Multidose Administration of OLT1177	
Dose	Adverse Event	Dose	Adverse Event
Placebo	Headache	100 mg	Diarrhea
100 mg	Eczema	100 mg	Headache
1000 mg	Migraine		
1000 mg	Back pain		

== Potential Therapeutic Applications ==
=== Neurodegenerative diseases ===
Multiple Sclerosis:

Multiple sclerosis (MS) is a neurodegenerative disease characterized by the immune system deteriorating myelin. Myelin damage leads to the disruption of neuronal signaling, and dysregulated inflammatory levels. Dapansutrile was used in an experimental autoimmune encephalomyelitis (EAE) mouse model to understand its possible underlying effects for MS. It was found that mice fed with the dapansutrile diet protected the mice from demyelination in the spinal cord as well as decreased their levels of interleukins IL-1β and IL-18. Currently, it is unclear whether the drug could inhibit microglial reactivity, but currently it has no known benefits to aid in the prevention of dementia and cognitive function.

=== Inflammation ===
Gouty Arthritis:

Gouty arthritis is an inflammatory joint disorder, partly induced to the activation of the NLRP3 inflammasome and excess IL-1β activation which leads to gout attacks. This is due to excess uric acid in the blood which promotes the formation of uric acid crystals in the joints. Uric acid is a known danger signal and induce the cleavage signal of the caspase-1 NLRP3 inflammasome.

Animal Model Experiments: In 2018, two murine models were used to validate Dapansutrile as a drug beneficial for acute joint inflammation. They injected zymosan or monosodium urate crystals in order to induce gouty arthritis in mice. OLT1177 was then either injected intraperitoneally or through their diet. In essence, the drug reduced joint inflammation, as well as interleukin levels demonstrating its therapeutic benefit for this disease.

Clinical Trials: As for clinical trials, Olatec Therapeutics also conducted a phase 2.a trials where Dapansutrile was given to 29 subjects with gouty arthritis.

=== Cardiovascular Diseases ===
Acute Myocardial Infarction/ Heart Attack:

One of the major downstream effects of having coronary artery disease is possibility of having an acute myocardial infarction or heart attack. In mouse models, Dapansutrile was found to decrease infarct size a dose-dependent manner.

Heart failure:

Olatec Therapeutics conducted a phase 1 clinical trial for dapansutrile as a potential therapeutic for systolic heart failure. They have carried out a Phase 1 double blinded study with a total of 30 subjects to assess the drug's safety and pharmacodynamics. The drug was given in capsule form and the subjects were divided into 3 cohorts. Each cohort had 8 subjects taking an oral capsule with 100 mg Dapansutrile while 2 subjects were given the placebo capsule. Although the completion date of this clinical trial was on November 21, 2019, the results of the study have not yet been published.

Severe acute respiratory syndrome coronavirus 2 (SARS-CoV-2) / COVID-19:

Dapansutrile has been proposed by a number of scientists as a measure to reduce cardiovascular outcomes that seem to be brought on by COVID-19. The rationale behind using Dapansutrile is to inhibit the NLRP3 inflammasome and reduce the chances of a cytokine storm which seems to cause multi-organ failure in COVID-19 patients. Subjects with COVID-19 have shown to have an increased concentration of pro-inflammatory cytokines resulting in the cytokine storm, and thus producing an exhaustion of lymphocytes. NLRP3 not only activates cytokines but other key players that can inflict myocardial damages, and acute respiratory distress syndrome (ARDS), and its inhibition has been found to deter these outcomes. Thus, dapansutrile is proposed as a possible mediator to relief and prevent COVID-19 symptoms and effects.
