= PLAID syndrome =

- Other names: PLCG2-associated antibody deficiency and immune dysregulation
- PLAID syndrome is inherited via an autosomal dominant manner
- Specialty: Dermatology

PLAID syndrome is an inherited condition characterised by antibody deficiency and immune dysregulation, first described in 2012. The name is an acronym of "PLCG2-associated antibody deficiency and immune dysregulation". It is characterised by cold-induced urticaria, autoimmunity, atopy and humoral immune deficiency.

== Presentation ==
This condition is characterised by cold induced urticaria, autoimmunity, atopy and humoral immune deficiency. The humeral immune deficiency results in recurrent bronchopulmonary infections. Cutaneous granulomas may also occur.

The urticaria usually appears within 12 months of birth but may appear immediately after birth. Swallowing cold materials may be associated with discomfort.

Autoimmune thyroiditis and vitiligo may occur. Recurrent infections may lead to the development of bronchiectasis.

== Genetics ==
The syndrome is caused by mutations in the phospholipase C gamma 2 (PLCG2) gene. This gene is located on the long arm of chromosome 16 (16q23.3).

The pathogenesis of this condition is not understood. It is however known that phospholipase C gamma is an important signalling mediation for natural killer cells.

== Diagnosis ==
Two thirds of patients have positive anti nuclear antibodies. The IgM levels are usually low and a low IgA is common. There is a poor antibody response to pneumococcal vaccines. The natural killer cells are low or low normal. Switched memory B cells (IgM, IgD, CD27+) may be present in the blood.

=== Differential diagnosis ===
Familial cold urticaria

== Epidemiology ==
This is considered a rare condition, with 30 patients described in the literature up to 2019.

== History ==
This condition was first described in 2012. The name is an acronym of PLCG2-associated antibody deficiency and immune dysregulation.
