= Keratoendotheliitis fugax hereditaria =

- Other names: Keratitis fugax hereditaria
- Specialty: Ophthalmology

Keratoendotheliitis fugax hereditaria is an autosomal dominantly inherited disease of the cornea, caused by a point mutation in cryopyrin (also known as NALP3) that in humans is encoded by the NLRP3 gene located on the long arm of chromosome 1.

In keratoendotheliitis fugax hereditaria, patients suffer from periodical transient inflammation of the corneal endothelium and stroma, leading to short term obscuration of vision and, in some patients after repeated attacks, to central corneal stromal opacities. Approximately 50 known cases have been reported in the literature. The disease so far has only been described from Finland, but exome databases suggest it may be more widely distributed in people of European ancestry.

Keratoendotheliitis fugax hereditaria is thought to belong to cryopyrin-associated periodic syndromes.

== Presentation ==
Patients experience repeated unilateral attacks of keratitis 1 to 6 times per year, beginning at the age of 5 to 28 years. Men and women are equally affected. Attacks get less severe and less frequent in middle age. No seasonal variation has been reported. The symptoms are redness of the eye, pain, and photophobia. The attack may be associated with anterior chamber flare. These symptoms disappear in 1 to 2 days, but blurred vision may last for a few weeks.

During the acute symptoms, a slit lamp shows pseudoguttae, dark patches in the corneal endothelium, thought to represent patchy corneal endothelial swelling. The endothelium appears normal between attacks. The attack can be misdiagnosed and treated as an acute iridocyclitis. Visual acuity transiently deteriorates during the attack.

A typical corneal opacity of the patient with keratoendotheliitis fugax hereditaria

Older patients may show faint to definite central, horizontally oval, bilateral stromal opacities. The opacities may be associated with decreased visual acuity, but they have not been severe enough to need corneal transplantation.

== Genetics ==
Keratoendotheliitis fugax hereditaria is inherited in an autosomal dominant manner, meaning an affected individual must inherit only one mutated allele from one parent. The protein, cryopyrin is coded for by the gene NLRP3, located at 1q44. The disease is frequent in Finland, and this population has a common mutation D21H accounting for all reported cases in this population. It has not been described in any other populations. However, the mutation was found in exome databases at a minor allele frequency (MAF) of 0.023% and in the Finnish and at an MAF of 0.0090% in aggregated non-Finnish European populations.

== Diagnosis ==
Upon clinical suspicion, diagnostic testing will consist of identifying cornea pseudoguttata by using a specular microscope or confocal microscope. Molecular genetic testing is also an option.

== Treatment ==
Patients have reported benefit from immediate treatment of their attacks with a topical corticosteroid or non-steroidal anti-inflammatory drug (NSAID) applied a few times a day for up to one week. Some patients have found more benefit from an oral NSAID.

== Prognosis ==
The repeated corneal inflammation over time can lead to reduced visual acuity.

== History ==
Keratoendotheliitis fugax hereditaria was first described in 1964 by Olavi Valle (1934–2013), a Finnish ophthalmologist with an interest in hereditary eye diseases. He reported this disease as keratitis fugax hereditaria in a family with 10 affected members over 4 generations. Two decades later, a second Finnish family with 21 affected members in 5 generations was reported by other Finnish ophthalmologists who highlighted transient corneal endothelial changes, and proposed the term keratoendotheliitis fugax hereditaria.
