= Canakinumab =

Pharmaceutical drug

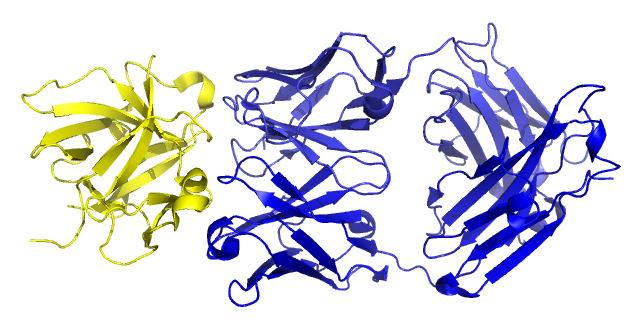
- Ribbon diagram of canakinumab (blue) bound to IL-1β (yellow) from PDB entry 5bvp

Monoclonal antibody
- Type: Whole antibody
- Source: Human
- Target: IL-1β

Clinical data
- Trade names: Ilaris
- Other names: ACZ885, ACZ-885
- AHFS/Drugs.com: Monograph
- MedlinePlus: a622024
- License data: US DailyMed: Canakinumab
- Pregnancy category: AU: B3
- Routes of administration: Intravenous, subcutaneous
- ATC code: L04AC08 (WHO)

Legal status
- Legal status: AU: S4 (Prescription only); US: ℞-only; EU: Rx-only; In general: ℞ (Prescription only)

Identifiers
- CAS Number: 914613-48-2
- DrugBank: DB06168
- ChemSpider: none
- UNII: 37CQ2C7X93
- KEGG: D09315
- ChEMBL: ChEMBL1201834

Chemical and physical data
- Formula: C_{6452}H_{9958}N_{1722}O_{2010}S_{42}
- Molar mass: 145157.20 g·mol^{−1}

Canakinumab, sold under the brand name Ilaris, is a medication for the treatment of systemic juvenile idiopathic arthritis, active Still's disease, including adult-onset Still's disease, gout flares. It is a human monoclonal antibody targeted at interleukin-1β. It has no cross-reactivity with other members of the interleukin-1 family, including interleukin-1 alpha.

Common side effects include infections (colds and upper respiratory tract infections), abdominal pain and injection-site reactions.

== Medical uses ==
=== United States ===
Canakinumab is approved for the treatment of:

- cryopyrin-associated periodic syndromes (CAPS)
- gout
- tumor necrosis factor receptor associated periodic syndrome (TRAPS)
- hyperimmunoglobulin D syndrome (HIDS)/mevalonate kinase deficiency (MKD)
- familial mediterranean fever (FMF)
- Still's disease, including adult-onset Still's disease.

CAPS is a spectrum of autoinflammatory syndromes including Familial Cold Autoinflammatory Syndrome (FCAS), Muckle–Wells syndrome (MWS), and Neonatal-Onset Multisystem Inflammatory Disease (NOMID).

=== European Union ===
Canakinumab is approved for the treatment of:

- cryopyrin-associated periodic syndromes (CAPS)
- autoinflammatory periodic fever syndromes
- tumour necrosis factor receptor associated periodic syndrome (TRAPS)
- hyperimmunoglobulin D syndrome (HIDS)/mevalonate kinase deficiency (MKD)
- familial Mediterranean fever (FMF)
- Still's disease
- gouty arthritis.

== Adverse effects ==
Injection site reactions such as redness and pain are common, occurring in approximately 15.5% of cases. The FDA prescribing information includes a warning for potential increased risk of serious infections due to IL-1 blockade. Macrophage activation syndrome (MAS) is a known, life-threatening disorder that may develop in people with rheumatic conditions, in particular Still's disease, and should be aggressively treated. Treatment with immunosuppressants may increase the risk of malignancies. People are advised not to receive live vaccinations during treatment.

== History ==
Canakinumab was developed by Novartis for the treatment of rheumatoid arthritis, completing a trial in October 2009.It is also in trials for schizophrenia. In gout, it may result in better outcomes than a low dose of a steroid, but costs five thousand times more.

The U.S. Food and Drug Administration (FDA) approved canakinumab for CAPS in June 2009, followed by the European Medicines Agency (EMA) in October.

In September 2016, the FDA approved the use of canakinumab tumor necrosis factor receptor associated periodic syndrome (TRAPS), hyperimmunoglobulin D syndrome (HIDS)/mevalonate kinase deficiency (MKD), and familial mediterranean fever (FMF).

In June 2020, canakinumab was approved in the United States for the indication to treat active Still's disease, including adult-onset Still's disease.

The CANTOS trial evaluated canakinumab for chronic obstructive pulmonary disease, gout, and coronary artery disease. In August 2017, results were announced at the European Society of Cardiology. Those treated in CANTOS had a 15% reduction in deaths from heart attacks, stroke and cardiovascular disease combined. However, CANTOS reported serious side-effects and no statistically significant overall survival benefit. Further analysis showed a significant (1/3-2/3) reduction in lung cancer incidence and mortality in the treatment group.

Overall, canakinumab was tolerated well with essentially identical discontinuation rates compared to placebo. Mild neutropenia and thrombocytopenia were slightly more common in those treated with canakinumab. Rates of death due to infection or sepsis were low but more likely in the canakinumab group compared to placebo (incidence rate 0.31 vs. 0.18 per 100 person-years, P = 0.02). In terms of the types of infections that occurred during follow up, only pseudomembranous colitis was more common in the canakinumab group; no evidence of opportunistic infection was observed, data emphasizing that canakinumab is not a clinically immunosuppressive intervention. Further demonstrating this issue, random allocation to canakinumab as compared to placebo in CANTOS resulted in large and highly significant dose-dependent reductions in cancer fatality, incident lung cancer, and fatal lung cancer.

— CANTOS

Nonetheless, David Goff, director of the division of cardiovascular sciences at the National Heart, Lung and Blood Institute claimed the "public health impact potential is really substantial", and estimated that in the United States 3 million people might benefit from the drug.

In August 2023, the FDA approved canakinumab for the symptomatic treatment of adults with gout flares in whom nonsteroidal anti-inflammatory drugs (NSAIDs) and colchicine are contraindicated, are not tolerated, or do not provide an adequate response, and in whom repeated courses of corticosteroids are not appropriate, based on three studies.
