= Cold urticaria =

Allergic reaction to low temperatures

Cold Urticaria
- Other names: Cold hives
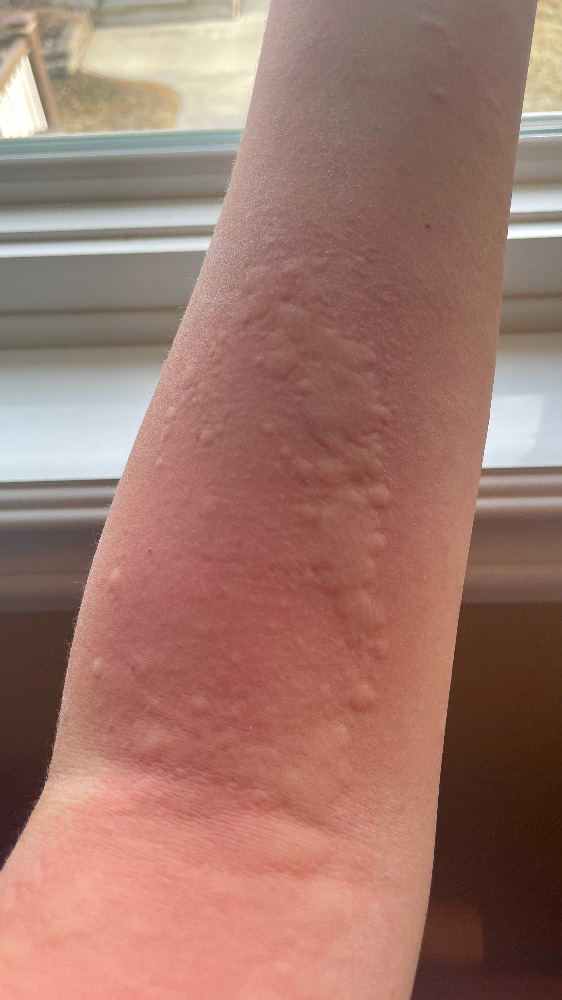
- Allergic urticaria on arm in the form of hives induced by cold.
- Specialty: Dermatology
- Causes: Exposure to cold stimulus

Cold urticaria (essentially meaning cold hives) is a disorder in which large red welts called hives (urticaria) form on the skin after exposure to a cold stimulus. The hives are usually itchy and often the hands, feet and other parts of the body will become itchy and swollen as well. Hives vary in size from about 7 mm in diameter to as big as about 27 mm or larger.

This disorder, or perhaps two disorders with the same clinical manifestations, can be inherited (familial cold urticaria) or acquired (primary acquired cold urticaria). The acquired form is most likely to begin between ages 18 and 25, although it can occur as early as 5 years old in some cases. Life-threatening risks include suffocation resulting from swollen tissue (pharyngeal angioedema) induced by cold foods or beverages, drowning after shock from swimming in cold water, and anaphylactic shock.

== Types ==
Cold urticaria may be divided into the following types:

=== Primary cold contact urticaria ===
Primary cold contact urticaria is a cutaneous condition characterized by wheals, and occurs in rainy, windy weather, after swimming in cold water, and after contact with cold objects, such as ice cubes.

=== Secondary cold contact urticaria ===
Secondary cold contact urticaria is a cutaneous condition characterized by wheals, due to serum abnormalities such as cryoglobulinemia or cryofibrinogenemia are extremely rare, and are then associated with other manifestations such as Raynaud's phenomenon or purpura.

=== Reflex cold urticaria ===
Reflex cold urticaria is a cutaneous condition in which generalized cooling of the body induces widespread welting.

=== Familial cold urticaria ===
Familial cold urticaria (also known as familial cold autoinflammatory syndrome, FCAS) is an autosomal dominant condition characterized by rash, conjunctivitis, fever/chills and arthralgias elicited by exposure to cold – sometimes temperatures below 22 °C (72 °F).

It has been mapped to CIAS1 and is a slightly milder member of the disease family including Muckle–Wells syndrome and NOMID. It is rare and is estimated as having a prevalence of 1 per million people and mainly affects Americans and Europeans.

FCAS is one of the cryopyrin-associated periodic syndromes (CAPS) caused by mutations in the CIAS1/NALP3 (aka NLRP3) gene at location 1q44.

The effect of FCAS on the quality of life of patients is far reaching. A survey of patients in the United States in 2008 found that "[t]o cope with their underlying disease and to try to avoid symptomatic, painful, flares patients reported limiting their work, school, family, and social activities. Seventy-eight percent of survey participants described an impact of the disease on their work, including absenteeism and impaired job advancement; frequently, they quit their job as a consequence of their disease".

Treatment using anakinra (Kineret) has been shown effective for FCAS, although this does mean daily injections of the immunosuppressant into an area such as the lower abdomen. The monoclonal antibody canakinumab (Ilaris) is also used.

== Signs and symptoms ==
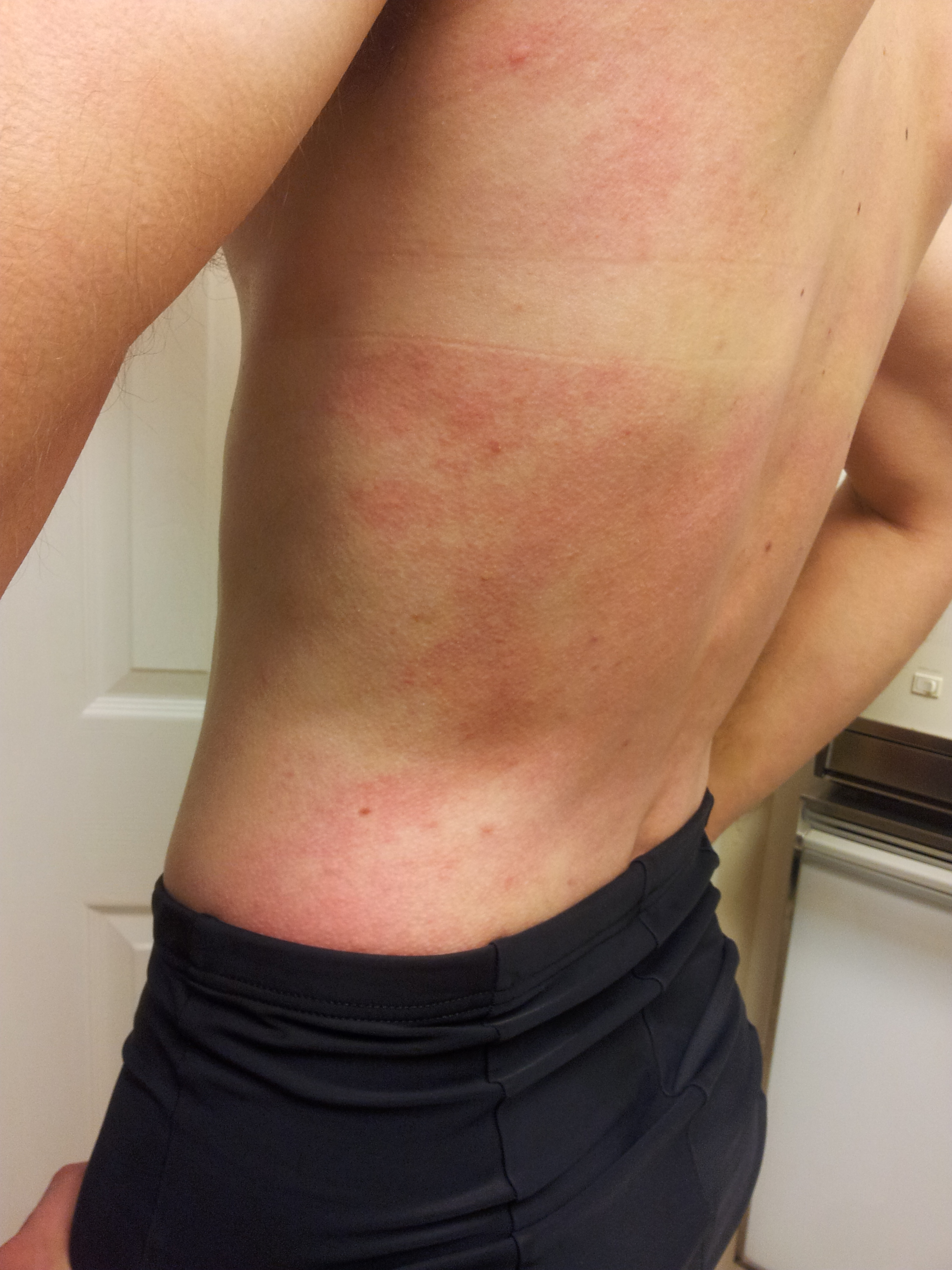
Hives on the back from exposure to cold air on an individual with cold allergy. The hives were induced by riding a stationary bike shirtless for an hour next to a door cracked open on a cool day. The temperature of the air flowing in was around 10 °C (50 °F). The lighter band at chest height was covered by a heart rate monitor strap.

When the body is exposed to the cold in individuals affected by the condition, hives appear and the skin in the affected area typically becomes itchy. Hives result from dilation of capillaries which allow fluid to flow out into the surrounding tissue which is the epidermis. They resolve when the body absorbs this fluid. The border of a hive is described as polycyclic, or made up of many circles, and changes as fluid leaks out and then is absorbed. Pressing on a hive causes the skin to blanch (turn pale as blood flow is interrupted), distinguishing it from a bruise or papule.

Hives may appear immediately or after a delay. Hives can last for a few minutes or a few days, and vary from person to person. Also, a burning sensation occurs. A serious reaction is most likely to occur for patients where the hives occur with less than three minutes of exposure (during a cold test).

== Cause ==
The hives are a histamine reaction in response to cold stimuli, including a drastic drop in temperature, cold air, and cold water. There are many causes for cold hives, most being spontaneous and idiopathic, without known mechanism of origin. Some rare conditions can cause cold hives, and it can be useful to test for these conditions if the cold hives are in any way unusual.

Scientists from the USA National Institutes of Health have identified a genetic mutation in three unrelated families that causes a rare immune disorder characterized by excessive and impaired immune function: immune deficiency, autoimmunity, inflammatory skin disorders and cold-induced hives (cold urticaria).

"The mutation discovered occurs in a gene for phospholipase C-gamma2 (PLCG2), an enzyme involved in the activation of immune cells. The investigators have named the condition PLCG2-associated antibody deficiency and immune dysregulation, or PLAID."

== Diagnosis ==
Diagnosis is typically obtained by an allergist or other licensed practitioner performing a cold test. During the cold test, a piece of ice is placed inside a thin plastic bag and held against the forearm, typically for 3–4 minutes. A positive result is a specific looking mark of raised red hives. The hives may be the shape of the ice, or it may radiate from the contact area of the ice. However, while these techniques assist in diagnosis, they do not provide information about temperature and stimulation time thresholds at which patients will start to develop symptoms, which is essential because it can establish disease severity and monitor the effectiveness of treatment.

== Management ==
Management largely consists of avoiding exposures that could trigger a reaction and taking medicine to manage the reaction. The best treatment for this allergy is avoiding exposure to cold temperatures.

=== Avoiding triggers ===
Anything that lowers the skin temperature (not body's core temperature) can trigger a reaction in affected people. Avoiding exposures limits the risk of a reaction. The reaction usually affects the body parts that are exposed, so cold air could trigger a reaction to exposed skin or in the breathing passages if cold air is inhaled. Risky exposures include:

- Situations:
  - Cold weather, including snow: Exposure to cold or cool air can quickly trigger a reaction; for example walking by the open freezer cases in a supermarket.
  - Air conditioning: Entering a cool building during a summer day can result in a reaction.
  - Cool/cold surfaces: Sitting on sidewalks which are cool, leaning on or grabbing a cold pole can result in hives forming on the area which had contact with the cool surfaces.
  - Cold IV lines: Sometimes IV lines are cold, which can result in a reaction. A line of hives may appear within 6 to 8 in (15 to 20 cm) from the IV site in the pattern of a line going up the limb.
- Activities:
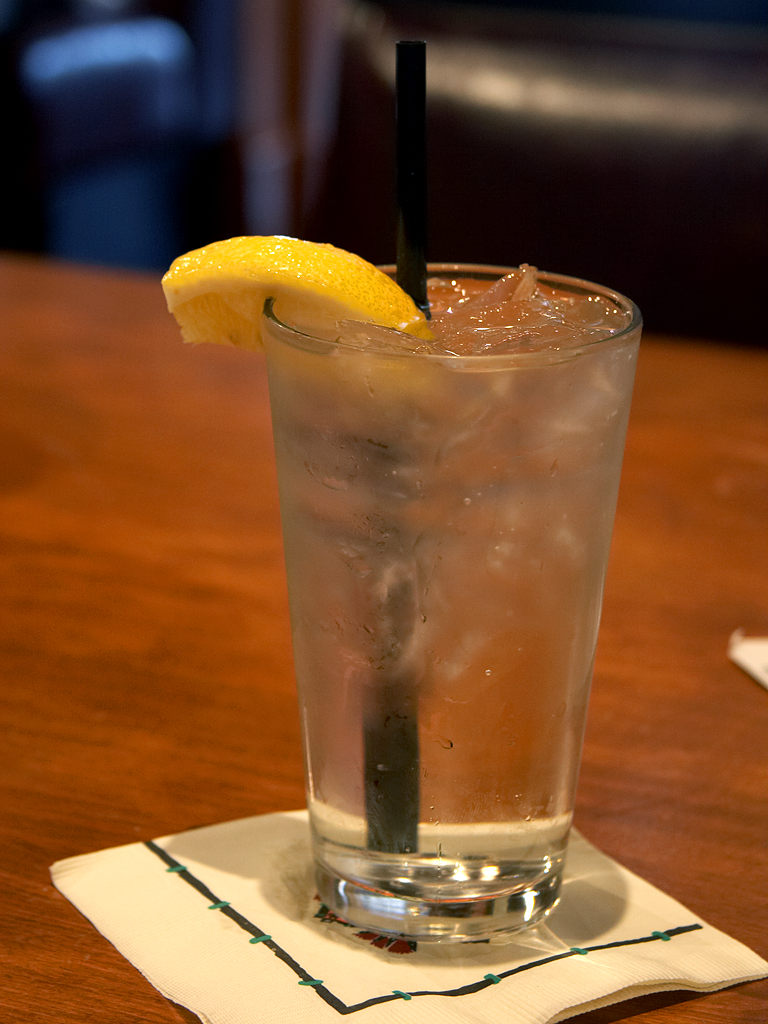
  - Drinking cold beverages can trigger hives in people with cold urticaria.
    Cold foods and drinks: Eating or drinking cold or cool substances such as ice cream or iced tea may result in a reaction inside the mouth and throat.
  - Swimming: Swimming can be especially dangerous, as the rapid heart rate combined with the onset of hives can lead to hypotension, shock, and drowning.
  - Sweat: A reaction may even occur on a warm day or coming out of a sauna when there is sweat on the skin, since the reaction is triggered by skin temperature, not core temperature. If there is a breeze, it will rapidly cool the skin and create hives.
  - Restriction of blood flow: Activities which cause tense muscles and reduce blood flow can cool the body parts enough to trigger itching and hives.

=== Drugs ===
The first-line therapy is symptomatic relief with second-generation H_{1}-antihistamines. If standard dosing is ineffective, increasing dosages up to fourfold is recommended to control symptoms.

The second-generation H_{1}-antihistamine rupatadine was found to significantly reduce the development of chronic cold urticaria symptom without an increase in adverse effects at doses of 20 mg and 40 mg.

Allergy medications containing antihistamines such as diphenhydramine (Benadryl), cetirizine (Zyrtec), loratadine (Claritin), cyproheptadine (Periactin), and fexofenadine (Allegra) may be taken orally to prevent and relieve some of the hives. For those who have severe anaphylactic reactions, a prescribed medicine such as doxepin, taken daily, should help to prevent and/or lessen the likelihood of a reaction and thus, anaphylaxis. The effectiveness of topical antihistamine creams against hives induced by cold temperature has not been evaluated.

Cold hives can result in a potentially serious or even fatal systemic reaction (anaphylactic shock). People with cold hives may have to carry an injectable form of epinephrine (like Epi-pen or Twinject) for use in the event of a serious reaction.

Studies have found that omalizumab (Xolair) may be an effective and safe treatment for cold urticaria in patients who do not sufficiently respond to standard treatments.

Ebastine has been proposed as an approach to prevent acquired cold urticaria.

== See also ==
- Amyloidosis
- Cholinergic urticaria, a similar hives reaction in response to heat
- Aquagenic urticaria
- Diascopy
- Erythema
- Goose bumps, an unrelated, normal response to cold temperatures
- List of cutaneous conditions
- Skin lesion
- PLAID syndrome
