= Interleukin-1 receptor antagonist =

Protein and coding gene in humans

IL1RN
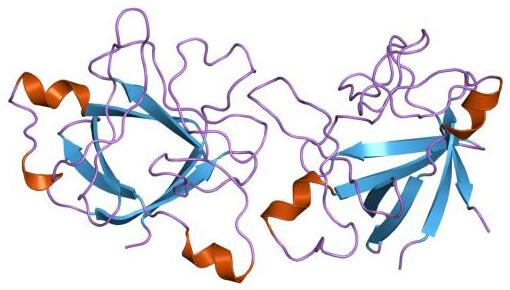

Identifiers
- Aliases: IL1RN, DIRA, ICIL-1RA, IL-1RN, IL-1ra, IL-1ra3, IL1F3, IL1RA, IRAP, MVCD4, interleukin 1 receptor antagonist
- External IDs: OMIM: 147679; MGI: 96547; GeneCards: IL1RN
Available structures
PDB	Ortholog search: PDBe RCSB
PDB	List of PDB id codes 1ILR, 1ILT, 1IRA, 1IRP, 2IRT

Gene location (Human)
Chr.	Chromosome 2 (human)
Band	2q14.1	Start	113,099,315 bp
Band	2q14.1	End	113,134,016 bp

Gene location (Mouse)
Chr.	Chromosome 2 (mouse)
Band	2 A3|2 16.36 cM	Start	24,226,865 bp
Band	2 A3|2 16.36 cM	End	24,241,506 bp
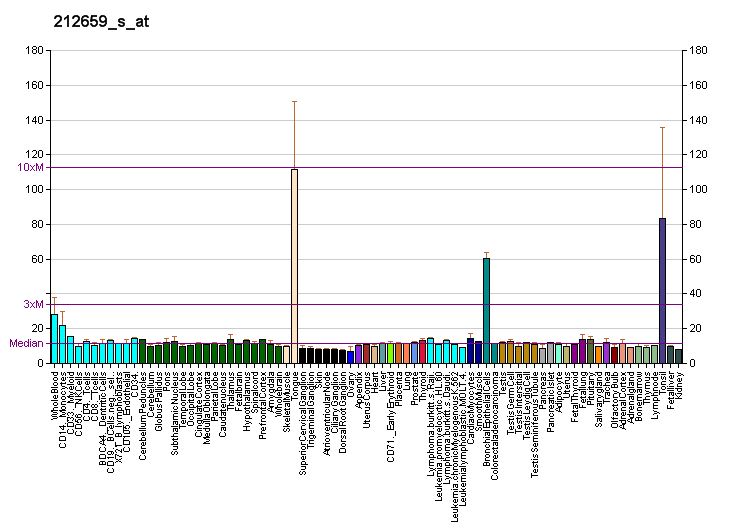

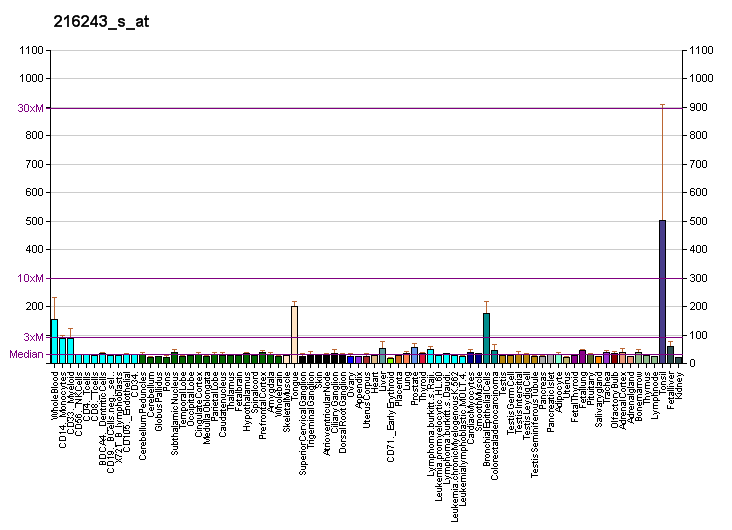

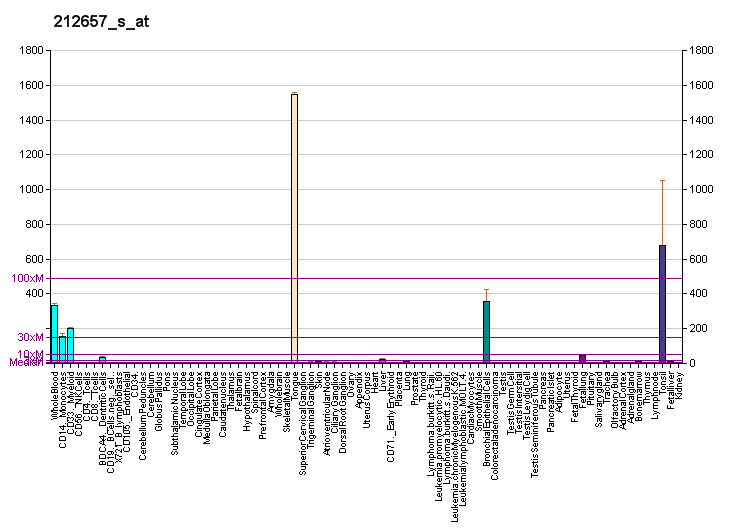
RNA expression pattern
Bgee	Human / Mouse (ortholog); Top expressed in: buccal mucosa cell; palpebral conjunctiva; mucosa of pharynx; gums; oral cavity; gingival epithelium; body of tongue; periodontal fiber; amniotic fluid; skin of abdomen / Top expressed in: granulocyte; stroma of bone marrow; lip; esophagus; lumbar subsegment of spinal cord; left colon; skin of back; skin of external ear; skin of abdomen; conjunctival fornix; More reference expression data
BioGPS	More reference expression data
Gene ontology
Molecular function	interleukin-1 type I receptor antagonist activity; interleukin-1, type II receptor binding; protein binding; interleukin-1, type I receptor binding; interleukin-1 type II receptor antagonist activity; interleukin-1 receptor binding; cytokine activity; interleukin-1 receptor antagonist activity
Cellular component	cytoplasm; vesicle; plasma membrane; intracellular anatomical structure; extracellular region; extracellular exosome; extracellular space
Biological process	negative regulation of interleukin-1-mediated signaling pathway; lipid metabolism; response to glucocorticoid; insulin secretion; acute-phase response; negative regulation of heterotypic cell-cell adhesion; negative regulation of cytokine-mediated signaling pathway; inflammatory response; immune response; fever generation; regulation of signaling receptor activity; cytokine-mediated signaling pathway; neutrophil chemotaxis; positive regulation of interleukin-6 production; positive regulation of I-kappaB kinase/NF-kappaB signaling; positive regulation of JNK cascade; interleukin-1-mediated signaling pathway; cellular response to lipopolysaccharide
Sources:Amigo / QuickGO
Orthologs
Databases	NCBI: entry; OMA: entry
Species	Human	Mouse
Entrez	3557	16181
Ensembl	ENSG00000136689	ENSMUSG00000026981
UniProt	P18510	P25085
RefSeq (mRNA)	NM_000577; NM_173841; NM_173842; NM_173843; NM_001318914 NM_001379360	NM_001039701; NM_001159562; NM_031167
RefSeq (protein)	NP_000568; NP_001305843; NP_776213; NP_776214; NP_776215 NP_001366289	NP_001034790; NP_001153034; NP_112444
Location (UCSC)	Chr 2: 113.1 – 113.13 Mb	Chr 2: 24.23 – 24.24 Mb
PubMed search
- Wikidata
View/Edit Human	View/Edit Mouse

The interleukin-1 receptor antagonist (IL-1RA) is a protein that in humans is encoded by the IL1RN gene.

IL-1RA was initially called the IL-1 inhibitor and was discovered separately in 1984 by two independent laboratories. IL-1RA is an agent that binds non-productively to the cell surface interleukin-1 receptor (IL-1R), the same receptor that binds interleukin 1 family (IL-1), preventing IL-1's from sending a signal to that cell.

== Function ==
IL-1RA is a member of the interleukin 1 cytokine family. IL-1RA is secreted by various types of cells including immune cells, epithelial cells, and adipocytes, and is a natural inhibitor of the pro-inflammatory effect of IL1β. This protein inhibits the activities of interleukin 1, alpha (IL1A) and interleukin 1, beta (IL1B), and modulates a variety of interleukin 1 related immune and inflammatory responses. This gene and five other closely related cytokine genes form a gene cluster spanning approximately 400 kb on chromosome 2. Four alternatively spliced transcript variants encoding distinct isoforms have been reported.

== Clinical significance ==
A polymorphism of this gene is reported to be associated with increased risk of osteoporotic fractures and gastric cancer.

Biallelic deleterious mutations in the IL1RN gene results in a rare autoinflammatory disease called deficiency of the interleukin-1–receptor antagonist (DIRA). Variants of the IL1RN gene is also associated with risk of schizophrenia. Elevated levels of IL-1RA has been found in serum of schizophrenia patients.

In treatment of temporomandibular joint osteoarthritis (TMJOA) the messenger RNA (mRNA) of IL-1RA can be used. The IL-1RA mRNA reduces pain and joint inflammation by blocking inflammatory cascade signals that lead to osteoarthritis progression.

A recombinant, slightly modified version of interleukin 1 receptor antagonist called anakinra is used in the treatment of rheumatoid arthritis, an autoimmune disease in which IL-1 plays a key role. Anakinra differs from native human IL-1RA in that it has the addition of a single methionine residue at its amino terminus

The cytoplasmic and secreted isoforms of IL-1RA can suppress tumors such as squamous cell carcinoma. The cytoplasmic isoform can protect epithelial cells from environmental factors and compete with IL1A in binding with receptors preventing activation. Then, the secreted isoform regulates IL1B in tumor microenvironments by inhibiting glycolysis of IL1B and proliferation of tumor cells, thus preventing the movement of tumor cells.

=== Use in horses ===
Interleukin 1 receptor antagonist is used in horses for the treatment of equine lameness secondary to joint and soft-tissue injury. IL-1RA obstructs the IL1B inflammatory cascade rather than helping to restore damaged tissue.
