= Rilonacept =

Medication

Clinical data
- Trade names: Arcalyst
- Other names: IL-1 Trap
- AHFS/Drugs.com: Monograph
- License data: EU EMA: by INN; US DailyMed: Rilonacept
- Routes of administration: Subcutaneous
- ATC code: L04AC04 (WHO)

Legal status
- Legal status: US: ℞-only; EU: Rx-only

Identifiers
- CAS Number: 501081-76-1
- DrugBank: DB06372
- ChemSpider: none
- UNII: 8K80YB5GMG
- KEGG: D06635
- ChEMBL: ChEMBL1201830

Chemical and physical data
- Formula: C_{9030}H_{13932}N_{2400}O_{2670}S_{74}
- Molar mass: 201209.36 g·mol^{−1}

Rilonacept, sold under the brand name Arcalyst, is a medication used to treat cryopyrin-associated periodic syndromes, including familial cold autoinflammatory syndrome, and Muckle–Wells syndrome; deficiency of interleukin-1 receptor antagonist; and recurrent pericarditis. Rilonacept is an interleukin 1 inhibitor.

Rilonacept is a dimeric fusion protein consisting of the ligand-binding domains of the extracellular portions of the human interleukin-1 receptor component (IL-1R1) and IL-1 receptor accessory protein (IL-1RAcP) linked in-line to the fragment-crystallizable portion (Fc region) of human IgG1 that binds and neutralizes IL-1.

Rilonacept was given an orphan drug designation by the U.S. Food and Drug Administration (FDA) and is used for the treatment of cryopyrin-associated periodic syndromes (CAPS), including familial cold autoinflammatory syndrome, Muckle–Wells syndrome. Rilonacept is the first drug approved by the FDA to treat recurrent pericarditis. Rilonacept was approved for medical use in the United States in February 2008.

On May 8, 2012, an FDA Advisory Panel voted 11–0 against the approval of rilonacept for the treatment of gout, stating that the benefits did not outweigh the risks associated with the drug.
