= Neonatal-onset multisystem inflammatory disease =

- Other names: Chronic infantile neurologic cutaneous and articular syndrome, or CINCA
- Specialty: Neurology, dermatology, rheumatology

Neonatal-onset multisystem inflammatory disease is a rare genetic periodic fever syndrome which causes uncontrolled inflammation in multiple parts of the body starting in the newborn period. Symptoms include skin rashes, severe arthritis, and chronic meningitis leading to neurologic damage. It is one of the cryopyrin-associated periodic syndromes.

NOMID can result from a mutation in the CIAS1 gene (also known as NLRP3 gene), which helps control inflammation. Mutations in this gene also cause familial cold urticaria and Muckle–Wells syndrome. NOMID has been successfully treated with the drug anakinra.

This syndrome is also known as the Prieur–Griscelli syndrome as it was first described by these authors in 1981.

== Signs and symptoms ==
The age of onset is almost always before 3 months of age. Many infants are born preterm (1/3 cases) and dysmature. The babies are frequently small for dates. The placenta may be abnormal with non-specific inflammation on histology. Umbilical cord anomalies have occasionally been reported. In severe cases, signs in the brain may be detected on prenatal ultrasound.

The disease manifests in many forms, making the diagnosis difficult, but the most common features of this disease involve the skin, joints, and central nervous system.

All have a maculopapular urticarial skin rash that is often present at birth (75% cases). It is probably more correctly described as an urticarial-like rash. The presence of the rash varies with time, and biopsy of these skin lesions shows a perivascular inflammatory infiltrate including granulocytes.

In about 35–65% of cases, arthritis occurs. Joint signs are variably expressed and can lead to transient swelling without sequelae between crises, or to unpredictable anomalies of growth cartilage and long bones epiphyses suggestive of a pseudo-tumour. Biopsies reveal hypertrophic cartilage without inflammatory cells. This most commonly affects the large joints (knees, ankles, elbows, and wrists) but may also involve the small joints of the hands and feet. It is usually bilateral and painful. A common and characteristic feature is giant kneecaps. Severe cases may result in contractures (joint deformities).

Most patients eventually have neurological problems. These manifest themselves in three principal ways: chronic meningitis, involvement of both the optic tract and eye, and sensorineural hearing loss. The chronic meningitis presents with the features of chronically raised intracranial pressure: headaches, vomiting, ventriculomegaly, hydrocephalus, macromegaly, cerebral atrophy, and optic atrophy. Some of these features may be evidenced on prenatal ultrasound. In 50% of cases, intellectual deficit occurs. Seizures occur in 25% of cases, but other manifestations are rare. Histological examination shows infiltration of the meninges with polymorphs.

Ocular manifestations occur in 80% of cases and include uveitis (70%), papillary involvement, conjunctivitis, and optical neuritis. If untreated, these may result in blindness (25%). The sensorineural hearing loss occurs in 75%, and tends to be progressive leading to deafness in 20% of cases.

Almost all children are remarkably short and have growth delay. Fever is extremely common but inconstant and is most often mild. Anemia is frequent. Other findings that have been reported include macrocephaly (95%), large fontanelle, prominent forehead, flattening of the nasal bridge (saddleback nose), short and thick extremities, and finger clubbing. The liver and spleen may be enlarged. Lymph node enlargement may also be present.

Later in life, secondary amyloidosis may occur. Delayed puberty and secondary amenorrhoea are not uncommon. Hoarseness due to inflammation of the laryngeal cartilage has also been reported.

== Causes ==
The disease is caused in 60% of cases by a mutated gene called CIAS1 that is known to be involved in other syndromes that appear somewhat similar, such as Muckle–Wells syndrome and familial cold urticaria. In many patients, the parents do not have the same mutation, indicating the problem was not inherited, even though it is a genetic disease. CIAS1 is involved in controlling the immune system, which is why the mutation leads to out-of-control inflammation.

== Diagnosis ==
The diagnosis is based on observing the patient and finding the constellation of symptoms and signs described above. A few blood tests help, by showing signs of long-standing inflammation. There is no specific test for the disease, though now that the gene that causes the disease is known, that may change.

Routine laboratory investigations are non-specific: anaemia, increased numbers of polymorphs, an elevated erythrocyte sedimentation rate and elevated concentrations of C-reactive protein are typically all the abnormalities found. Lumbar puncture shows elevated levels of polymorphs (20–70% of cases) and occasionally raised eosinophil counts (0–30% of cases). CSF neopterin may be elevated. The X ray abnormalities are unique and characteristic of this syndrome. These changes include bony overgrowth due to premature ossification of the patella and the long bone epiphyses in very young children and bowing of long bones with widening and shortening periosteal reaction in older ones.

Audiometry shows a progressive sensineural deafness. Visual examination shows optic atrophy and an increase in the blind spot. CT is usually normal but may show enlargement of the ventricles. MRI with contrast may show enhancement of leptomeninges and cochlea consistent with chronic meningitis. EEG shows a non-specific pattern with slow waves and spike discharges.

Polymorphs tend to show increased expression of CD10.

=== Differential diagnosis ===
- Aicardi–Goutières syndrome
- Still's disease
- Schnitzler syndrome
- Hyperimmunoglobulin D syndrome
- Familial Mediterranean fever
- Marshall syndrome
- Castleman's disease

Still's disease does not affect children under 6 months old. Hyperimmunoglobulin D syndrome in 50% of cases is associated with mevalonate kinase deficiency which can be measured in the leukocytes.

== Treatment ==
There have been attempts to control the inflammation using drugs that work in other conditions where inflammation is a problem. The most successful of these are steroids, but they have side effects when used long term. Other medications, including methotrexate, colchicine and canakinumab, have been tried with some success. Otherwise, the treatment is supportive, or aimed solely at controlling symptoms and maximizing function.

== Prognosis ==
Overall, the prognosis for patients with NOMID is not good, though many (80%) live into adulthood, and a few appear to do relatively well. They are at risk for leukemia, infections, and some develop deposits of protein aggregated called amyloid, which can lead to kidney failure and other problems. The neurologic problems are most troubling. The finding that other diseases are related and a better understanding of where the disease comes from may lead to more effective treatments.

== Epidemiology ==
This is a rare condition with an incidence estimated to be less than 1 in a million live births. About 100 cases have been reported worldwide. The bulk of cases are sporadic but familial forms with autosomal dominant transmission have also been described.

== See also ==
- Deficiency of the interleukin-1–receptor antagonist (DIRA)
- Familial cold urticaria, a similar disease
- List of cutaneous conditions
- Muckle–Wells syndrome, a similar disease
