= Interleukin 1 beta =

Mammalian protein found in Homo sapiens

IL1B
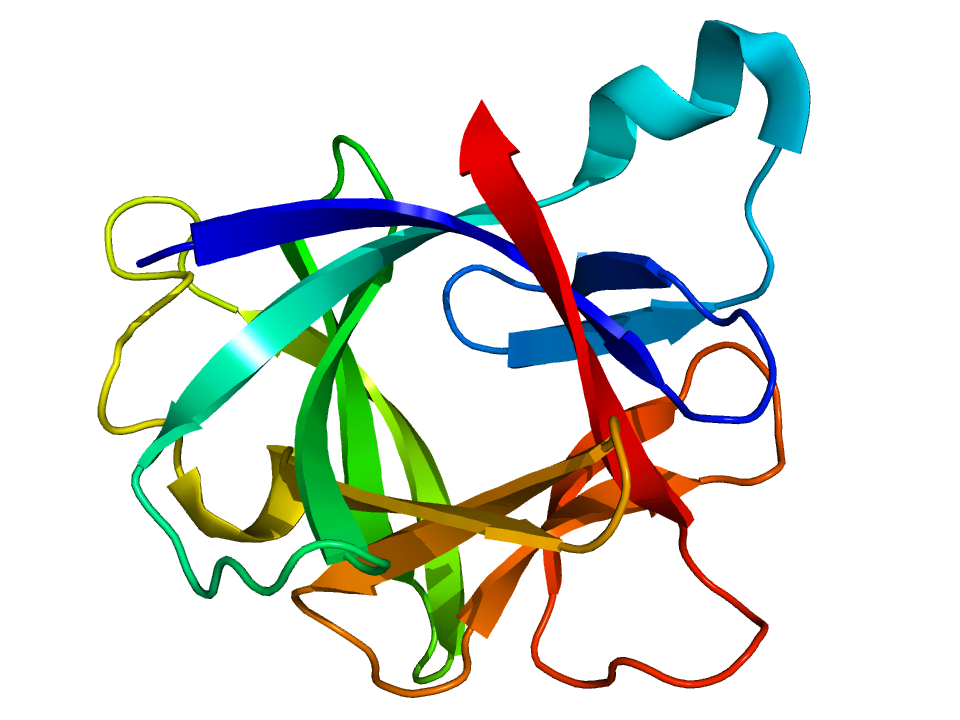

Identifiers
- Aliases: IL1B, IL-1, IL1-BETA, IL1F2, interleukin 1 beta, IL1beta
- External IDs: OMIM: 147720; MGI: 96543; GeneCards: IL1B
Available structures
PDB	Ortholog search: PDBe RCSB
PDB	List of PDB id codes 1HIB, 1I1B, 1IOB, 1ITB, 1L2H, 1S0L, 1T4Q, 1TOO, 1TP0, 1TWE, 1TWM, 21BI, 2I1B, 2KH2, 2NVH, 31BI, 3O4O, 3POK, 41BI, 4DEP, 4G6J, 4G6M, 4GAI, 4I1B, 5I1B, 6I1B, 7I1B, 9ILB, 4GAF, 5BVP

Gene location (Human)
Chr.	Chromosome 2 (human)
Band	2q14.1	Start	112,829,751 bp
Band	2q14.1	End	112,836,816 bp

Gene location (Mouse)
Chr.	Chromosome 2 (mouse)
Band	2 F1|2 62.97 cM	Start	129,206,490 bp
Band	2 F1|2 62.97 cM	End	129,213,059 bp
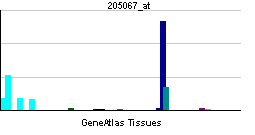

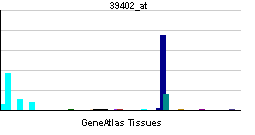
RNA expression pattern
Bgee	Human / Mouse (ortholog); Top expressed in: periodontal fiber; granulocyte; monocyte; blood; bone marrow cell; cartilage tissue; pancreatic ductal cell; gallbladder; appendix; decidua / Top expressed in: granulocyte; blood; tibiofemoral joint; spleen; embryo; bone marrow; islet of Langerhans; right lung; lumbar subsegment of spinal cord; right ventricle; More reference expression data
BioGPS	More reference expression data
Gene ontology
Molecular function	protein domain specific binding; interleukin-1 receptor binding; cytokine activity; integrin binding; protein binding
Cellular component	cytoplasm; cytosol; extracellular region; lysosome; extracellular exosome; secretory granule; vesicle; extracellular space
Biological process	positive regulation of protein phosphorylation; smooth muscle adaptation; positive regulation of calcidiol 1-monooxygenase activity; negative regulation of insulin receptor signaling pathway; cellular response to mechanical stimulus; positive regulation of interleukin-8 production; positive regulation of mitotic nuclear division; response to carbohydrate; embryo implantation; regulation of I-kappaB kinase/NF-kappaB signaling; negative regulation of cell population proliferation; apoptotic process; cellular response to organic substance; positive regulation of phagocytosis; regulation of insulin secretion; neutrophil chemotaxis; positive regulation of transcription, DNA-templated; positive regulation of protein export from nucleus; positive regulation of prostaglandin secretion; positive regulation of myosin light chain kinase activity; negative regulation of MAP kinase activity; positive regulation of T cell proliferation; positive regulation of interleukin-6 production; inflammatory response; negative regulation of lipid metabolic process; sequestering of triglyceride; hyaluronan biosynthetic process; positive regulation of heterotypic cell-cell adhesion; positive regulation of lipid catabolic process; cellular response to organic cyclic compound; positive regulation of fever generation; positive regulation of DNA-binding transcription factor activity; positive regulation of angiogenesis; response to lipopolysaccharide; positive regulation of NF-kappaB transcription factor activity; positive regulation of granulocyte macrophage colony-stimulating factor production; immune response; ectopic germ cell programmed cell death; leukocyte migration; lipopolysaccharide-mediated signaling pathway; positive regulation of vascular endothelial growth factor receptor signaling pathway; positive regulation of cell adhesion molecule production; response to ATP; monocyte aggregation; protein kinase B signaling; positive regulation of nitric oxide biosynthetic process; cell-cell signaling; positive regulation of monocyte chemotactic protein-1 production; regulation of nitric-oxide synthase activity; positive regulation of membrane protein ectodomain proteolysis; positive regulation of interferon-gamma production; MAPK cascade; positive regulation of histone acetylation; positive regulation of gene expression; negative regulation of glucose transmembrane transport; interleukin-1 beta production; positive regulation of T cell mediated immunity; extrinsic apoptotic signaling pathway in absence of ligand; positive regulation of I-kappaB kinase/NF-kappaB signaling; positive regulation of vascular endothelial growth factor production; negative regulation of extrinsic apoptotic signaling pathway in absence of ligand; negative regulation of lipid catabolic process; negative regulation of adiponectin secretion; regulation of establishment of endothelial barrier; positive regulation of cell division; signal transduction; positive regulation of transcription by RNA polymerase II; cytokine-mediated signaling pathway; regulation of defense response to virus by host; fever generation; positive regulation of JNK cascade; positive regulation of cell population proliferation; regulation of signaling receptor activity; positive regulation of epithelial to mesenchymal transition; positive regulation of cell migration; interleukin-6 production; astrocyte activation; regulation of neurogenesis; negative regulation of neurogenesis; negative regulation of synaptic transmission; positive regulation of glial cell proliferation; regulation of ERK1 and ERK2 cascade; interleukin-1-mediated signaling pathway; cellular response to lipopolysaccharide; positive regulation of neuroinflammatory response; positive regulation of p38MAPK cascade; positive regulation of NIK/NF-kappaB signaling; positive regulation of T-helper 1 cell cytokine production; positive regulation of prostaglandin biosynthetic process; positive regulation of complement activation; positive regulation of inflammatory response; response to interleukin-1; positive regulation of RNA biosynthetic process
Sources:Amigo / QuickGO
Orthologs
Databases	NCBI: entry; OMA: entry
Species	Human	Mouse
Entrez	3553	16176
Ensembl	ENSG00000125538	ENSMUSG00000027398
UniProt	P01584	P10749
RefSeq (mRNA)	NM_000576	NM_008361
RefSeq (protein)	NP_000567	NP_032387
Location (UCSC)	Chr 2: 112.83 – 112.84 Mb	Chr 2: 129.21 – 129.21 Mb
PubMed search
- Wikidata
View/Edit Human	View/Edit Mouse

Interleukin-1 beta (IL-1β) also known as leukocytic pyrogen, leukocytic endogenous mediator, mononuclear cell factor, lymphocyte activating factor and other names, is a pro-inflammatory cytokine protein that in humans is encoded by the IL1B gene.

== Function ==
There are two genes for interleukin-1 (IL-1): IL-1 alpha and IL-1 beta (this gene). IL-1β precursor is cleaved by cytosolic caspase 1 (interleukin 1 beta convertase) to form mature IL-1β.

IL-1β is a member of the interleukin 1 family of cytokines. This cytokine is produced by activated macrophages, monocytes, and a subset of dendritic cells known as slanDC, as a proprotein, which is proteolytically processed to its active form by caspase 1 (CASP1/ICE). This cytokine is an important mediator of the inflammatory response, and is involved in a variety of cellular activities, including cell proliferation, differentiation, and apoptosis. The induction of cyclooxygenase-2 (PTGS2/COX2) by this cytokine in the central nervous system (CNS) is found to contribute to inflammatory pain hypersensitivity. This gene and eight other interleukin 1 family genes form a cytokine gene cluster on chromosome 2.

IL-1β, in combination with IL-23, induced expression of IL-17, IL-21 and IL-22 by γδ T cells. This induction of expression is in the absence of additional signals. That suggests IL-1β is involved in modulation of autoimmune inflammation

Different inflammasome complex — cytosolic molecular complex — have been described. Inflammasomes recognize danger signals and activate proinflammatory process and production of IL-1β and IL-18. NLRP3 (contains three domain: pyrin domain, a nucleotide-binding domain and a leucine-rich repeat) type of inflammasome is activated by various stimuli and there are documented several diseases connected to NLRP3 activation like type 2 diabetes mellitus, Alzheimer's disease, obesity and atherosclerosis.

== Properties ==
Before cleavage by caspase 1, pro-IL-1β has a molecular weight of 37 kDa. The molecular weight of the proteolytically processed IL-1β is 17.5 kDa. IL-1β has the following amino acid sequence:

- APVRSLNCTL RDSQQKSLVM SGPYELKALH LQGQDMEQQV VFSMSFVQGE ESNDKIPVAL GLKEKNLYLS CVLKDDKPTL QLESVDPKNY PKKKMEKRFV FNKIEINNKL EFESAQFPNW YISTSQAENM PVFLGGTKGG QDITDFTMQF VSS

The physiological activity determined from the dose dependent proliferation of murine D10S cells is 2.5 × 10^{8} to 7.1 × 10^{8} units/mg.

IL-1β is present in other species of animals, however non-mammalian sequences of IL-1β lack a conserved cascase-1 cleavage site.

== Clinical significance ==
Increased production of IL-1β causes a number of different autoinflammatory syndromes, most notably the monogenic conditions referred to as Cryopyrin-Associated Periodic Syndromes (CAPS), due to mutations in the inflammasome receptor NLRP3 which triggers processing of IL-1β.

Intestinal dysbiosis has been observed to induce osteomyelitis through a IL-1β dependent manner.

The presence of IL-1β has been also found in patients with multiple sclerosis (a chronic autoimmune disease of the central nervous system). However, it is not known exactly which cells produce IL-1β. Treatment of multiple sclerosis with glatiramer acetate or natalizumab has also been shown to reduce the presence of IL-1β or its receptor.

=== Role in carcinogenesis ===
Several types of inflammasomes are suggested to play role in tumorgenesis due to their immunomodulatory properties, modulation of gut microbiota, differentiation and apoptosis. Over-expression of IL-1β caused by inflammasome may result in carcinogenesis. Some data suggest that NLRP3 inflammasome polymorphisms is connected to malignancies such as colon cancer and melanoma. It was reported that IL-1β secretion was elevated in the lung adenocarcinoma cell line A549. It has also been shown in another study that IL-1β, together with IL-8, plays an important role in chemoresistance of malignant pleural mesothelioma by inducing expression of transmembrane transporters. Another study showed that inhibition of inflammasome and IL-1β expression decreased development of cancer cells in melanoma.

Furthermore, it has been found that in breast cancer cells, IL-1β activates p38 and p42/22 MAPK pathways which ultimately lead to the secretion of the RANK/RANKL inhibitor osteoprotegerin. Higher osteoprotegerin and IL-1β levels are a characteristic of breast cancer cells with a higher metastatic potential.

=== In HIV-1 infections ===
The human immunodeficiency virus (HIV) infects cells of the immune system, such as macrophages, dendritic cells, and CD4^{+} T helper cells (T_{H}). The latter can be infected by the virus in various ways with different fates depending on the state of activation of the T helper cell.

Firstly, T_{H} cells can die of viral lysis due to an active infection that produces enough virions to kill the cell. Secondly, CD4^{+} T cells can be infected by the virus but instead of producing more viral particles, the cell enters a latent phase. In this period, the T helper cells looks identical from the outside but any stressor could lead to the renewed production of HIV and its propagation to new immune cells. Lastly, the T_{H} cell can become abortively infected, where the virus gets detected inside the cell and a programmed cell-death, known as pyroptosis, kills the infected cell. Pyroptosis is mediated via caspase-1 and is characterized by cell lysis and the secretion of IL-1β causing inflammation and attraction of more immune cells. This can create a cycle of CD4^{+} T cells getting abortively infect with HIV, dying of pyroptosis, new T helper cells arriving to the site of inflammation where they get infected again. The results is the depletion of T helper cells. Even though, levels of IL-1β in blood are not majorly different between HIV positive and negative individuals, studies have shown elevated levels of IL-1β of lymphatic tissue in HIV-infected individuals.

In fact, the gut-associated lymphoid tissue (GALT) has a high density of immune cells as the gut is an interface between symbiotic gut microbes that should remain with the host and pathogenic bacteria that should not gain access into the circulatory system. If HIV-infection leads to the secretion of IL-1βin monocytes and macrophages, it causes inflammation of this area. The mucosal epithelial layer responds to this by producing less or altering the tight junction proteins which makes it easier for pathogenic microbes to move into the lamina propria. Here, the pathogens can further activate local immune cells and amplify the inflammatory response.

=== Retinal degeneration ===
It has been shown that IL-1 family plays important role in inflammation in many degenerative diseases, such as age-related macular degeneration, diabetic retinopathy and retinitis pigmentosa. Significantly increased protein level of IL-1β has been found in the vitreous of diabetic retinopathy patient. The role of IL-1β has been investigated for potential therapeutic target for treatment of diabetic retinopathy. However, systemic using of canakinumab did not have a significant effect. The role of IL-1β in age-related macular degeneration has not been proven in patient, but in many animal models and in vitro studies it has been demonstrated the role of IL-1β in retinal pigmented epithelial cells and photoreceptor cells damage. NLRP3 inflammasome activate caspase-1 which catalyze cleavage of inactive cytosolic precursor pro-IL-1β to its mature form IL-1β. Retinal pigmented epithelial cells forms blood retinal barrier in human retina which is important for retinal metabolic activity, integrity and inhibition of immune cells infiltration. It has been shown that human retinal pigmented epithelial cells can secrete IL-1 β in exposure to oxidative stress. The inflammatory reaction leads to damage of retinal cells and infiltration of cells of the immune system. The inflammatory process including NLRP3 upregulation is one of the causes of age-related macular degeneration and other retinal diseases that lead to vision loss. Additionally, it has been shown that caspase-1 is upregulated in the retina of diabetic patients, causing a higher production of IL-1β and subsequent death of retinal neurons.

=== Neuroinflammation ===
Studies in mice on experimental autoimmune encephalomyelitis (EAE), a model for multiple sclerosis (MS) research, have found that blocking IL-1β could make the animals resistant to EAE. IL-1β led to the production of an antigen-specific pro-inflammatory subset of T helper cells (T_{H17}). In combination with other cytokines, interleukin-1β can upregulate the production of the cytokine GM-CSF which is correlated to neuroinflammation. Detailed mechanisms on this front are yet to be elucidated.

IL-1β has also been observed in elevated levels of the cerebrospinal fluid and brain tissues of Alzheimer patients. The amyloid-β plaques, that are characteristic of Alzheimer disease, are damage-associated molecular patterns (DAMPs) that are recognized by pattern recognition receptors (PRRs) and lead to the activation of microglia. Consequently, microglia release interleukin-1β among other cytokines. Nevertheless, the significance of IL-1β in Alzheimer disease and the onset of neuroinflammation still remains largely unknown.

Lastly, in vitro studies have shown that IL-1β causes an increase in mitochondrial glutaminase activity. In response, there is excessive glutamate secretion which has a neurotoxic effect.

== As a therapeutic target ==
Anakinra is a recombinant and slightly modified version of the human interleukin 1 receptor antagonist protein. Anakinra blocks the biologic activity of IL-1 alpha and beta by competitively inhibiting IL-1 binding to the interleukin type 1 receptor (IL-1RI), which is expressed in a wide variety of tissues and organs. Anakinra is marketed as Kineret and is approved in the US for treatment of RA, NOMID, DIRA.

Canakinumab is a human monoclonal antibody targeted at IL-1B, and approved in many countries for treatment of cryopyrin-associated periodic syndromes.

Rilonacept is an IL-1 trap developed by Regeneron targeting IL-1B, and approved in the US as Arcalyst.

== History ==
The fever-producing property of human leukocytic pyrogen (interleukin 1) was purified by Dinarello in 1977 with a specific activity of 10–20 nanograms/kg. In 1979, Dinarello reported that purified human leukocytic pyrogen was the same molecule that was described by Igal Gery in 1972. He named it lymphocyte-activating factor (LAF) because it was a lymphocyte mitogen. It was not until 1984 that interleukin 1 was discovered to consist of two distinct proteins, now called interleukin-1 alpha and interleukin-1 beta.

== Orthographic note ==
Because many authors of scientific manuscripts make the minor error of using a homoglyph, sharp s (ß), instead of beta (β), mentions of "IL-1ß" [sic] often become "IL-1ss" [sic] upon automated transcoding (because ß transcodes to ss). This is why so many mentions of the latter appear in web search results.
