= NLRP3 =

Human protein and coding gene

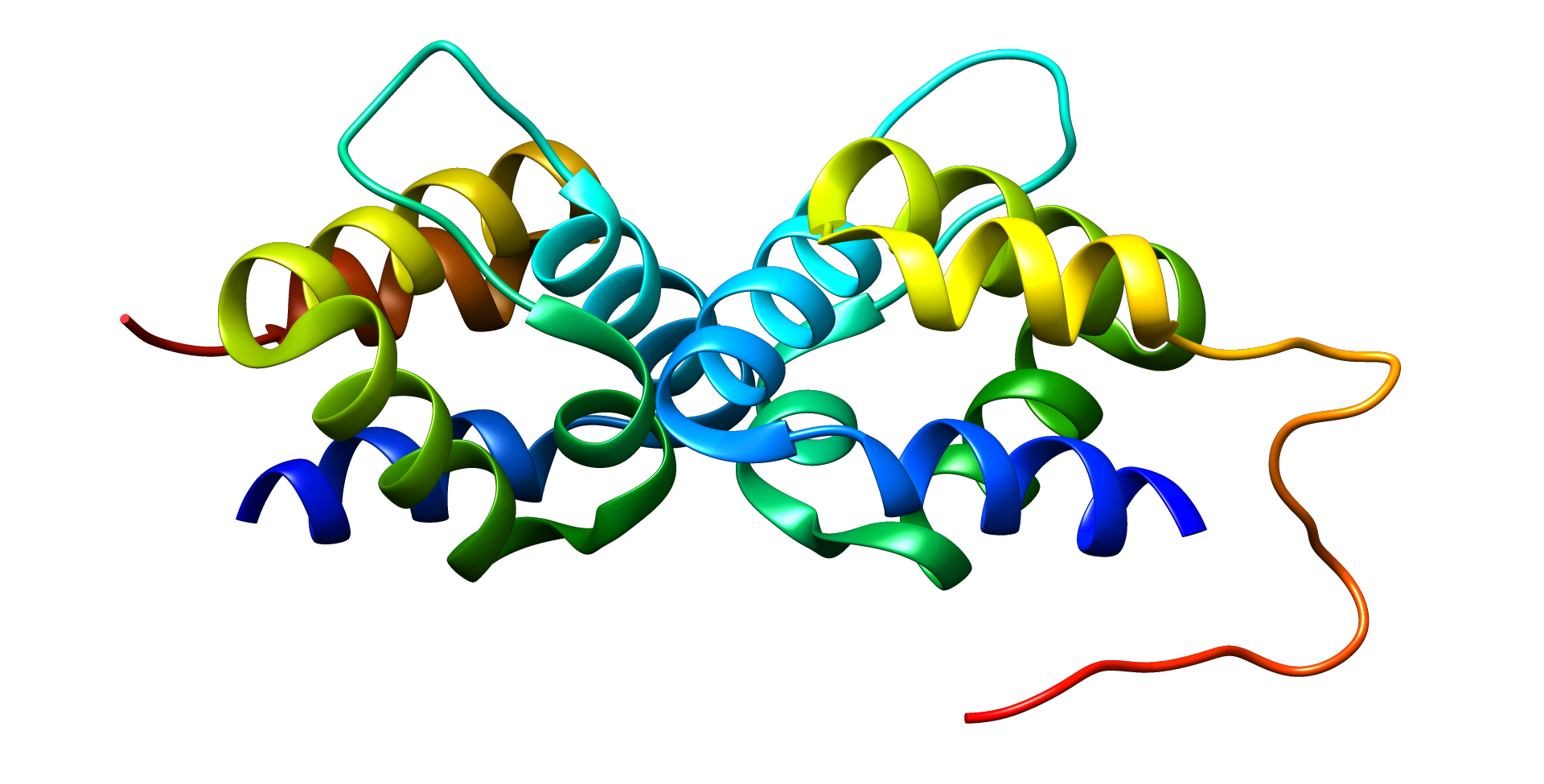

Identifiers
- Aliases: NLRP3, AGTAVPRL, AII, AVP, C1orf7, CIAS1, CLR1.1, FCAS, FCAS1, FCU, MWS, NALP3, PYPAF1, NLR family, pyrin domain containing 3, NLR family pyrin domain containing 3, DFNA34, KEFH
- External IDs: OMIM: 606416; MGI: 2653833; GeneCards: NLRP3
Available structures
PDB	Ortholog search: PDBe RCSB
PDB	List of PDB id codes 3QF2, 2NAQ

Gene location (Human)
Chr.	Chromosome 1 (human)
Band	1q44	Start	247,416,156 bp
Band	1q44	End	247,449,108 bp

Gene location (Mouse)
Chr.	Chromosome 11 (mouse)
Band	11|11 B1.3	Start	59,432,394 bp
Band	11|11 B1.3	End	59,457,782 bp
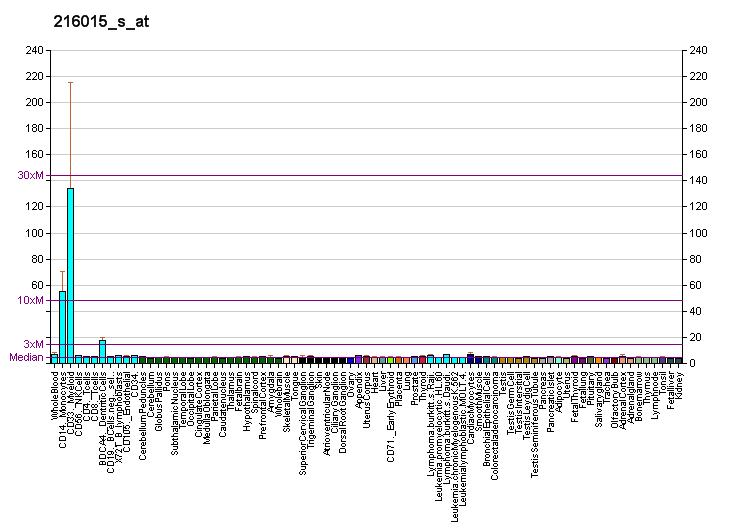

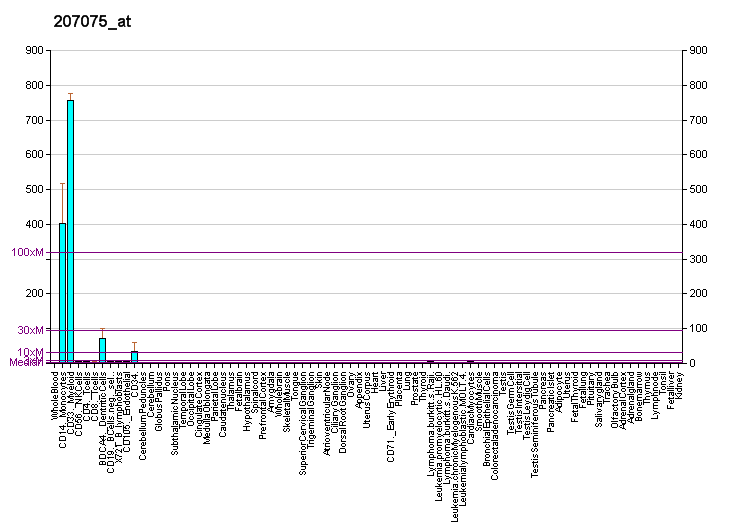
RNA expression pattern
Bgee	Human / Mouse (ortholog); Top expressed in: monocyte; granulocyte; blood; bone marrow cell; gallbladder; testicle; right lung; appendix; upper lobe of left lung; spleen / Top expressed in: granulocyte; blood; stroma of bone marrow; morula; calvaria; spleen; submandibular gland; gastrula; olfactory epithelium; meninges; More reference expression data
BioGPS	More reference expression data
Gene ontology
Molecular function	sequence-specific DNA binding; nucleotide binding; transcription factor binding; protein binding; peptidoglycan binding; ATP binding; identical protein binding
Cellular component	cytoplasm; cytosol; extracellular region; endoplasmic reticulum; inflammasome complex; nucleus; NLRP3 inflammasome complex; Golgi membrane; Golgi apparatus; membrane
Biological process	defense response; detection of biotic stimulus; NLRP3 inflammasome complex assembly; regulation of transcription, DNA-templated; negative regulation of acute inflammatory response; positive regulation of interleukin-5 production; interleukin-18 production; immune system process; positive regulation of interleukin-4 production; transcription, DNA-templated; positive regulation of cysteine-type endopeptidase activity involved in apoptotic process; positive regulation of interleukin-13 production; positive regulation of T-helper 17 cell differentiation; defense response to virus; protein complex oligomerization; positive regulation of T-helper 2 cell differentiation; regulation of inflammatory response; interleukin-1 beta production; positive regulation of type 2 immune response; inflammatory response; negative regulation of NF-kappaB transcription factor activity; activation of cysteine-type endopeptidase activity involved in apoptotic process; negative regulation of inflammatory response; cellular response to lipopolysaccharide; positive regulation of T-helper 2 cell cytokine production; signal transduction; positive regulation of transcription by RNA polymerase II; apoptotic process; innate immune response; protein deubiquitination; defense response to Gram-positive bacterium; positive regulation of NF-kappaB transcription factor activity; cellular response to peptidoglycan; negative regulation of NIK/NF-kappaB signaling
Sources:Amigo / QuickGO
Orthologs
Databases	NCBI: entry; OMA: entry
Species	Human	Mouse
Entrez	114548	216799
Ensembl	ENSG00000162711	ENSMUSG00000032691
UniProt	Q96P20	Q8R4B8
RefSeq (mRNA)	NM_001079821; NM_001127461; NM_001127462; NM_001243133; NM_004895 NM_183395	NM_145827; NM_001359638
RefSeq (protein)	NP_001073289; NP_001120933; NP_001120934; NP_001230062; NP_004886 NP_899632	NP_665826; NP_001346567
Location (UCSC)	Chr 1: 247.42 – 247.45 Mb	Chr 11: 59.43 – 59.46 Mb
PubMed search
- Wikidata
View/Edit Human	View/Edit Mouse

NLR family pyrin domain containing 3 (NLRP3) is a protein that in humans is encoded by the NLRP3 gene located on the long arm of chromosome 1. NLRP3 has previously been known as NACHT, LRR, and PYD domains-containing protein 3 [NALP3]; cryopyrin; cold induced autoinflammatory syndrome 1 (CIAS1), caterpillar-like receptor 1.1 (CLR1.1), and PYRIN-containing APAF1-like protein 1 (PYPAF1).

NLRP3 is a component of the innate immune system that functions as a pattern recognition receptor (PRR) – a cytosolic sensor that responds to pathogen-associated molecular patterns (PAMPs) and damage-associated molecular patterns (DAMPs). NLRP3 belongs to the NOD-like receptor (NLR) family of PRRs.

NLRP3 is expressed predominantly in macrophages, where it serves as a component of the inflammasome. The NLPR3 inflammasome triggers inflammation and an immune response, and causes cell death through pyroptosis or PANoptosis. Since its discovery in 2004, the NLRP3 inflammasome has emerged as a critical component of innate immunity, and mutations in the NLRP3 gene have been associated with a number of organ-specific autoimmune diseases, autoinflammatory diseases, and cancers. Hence, the NLRP3 inflammasome has become the best-understood inflammasome and a central focus of inflammation research.

== Structure ==
The domain structure of NLRP3 is reflected in its full name, nucleotide-binding domain, leucine-rich repeat family, pyrin domain containing 3. The protein contains an N-terminus pyrin domain (PYD), a NACHT domain containing a nucleotide-binding site (NBS), and a C-terminus LRR motif. NACHT, LRR, and PYD are acronyms for:

- NACHT – NAIP (neuronal apoptosis inhibitor protein), C2TA [class 2 transcription activator, of the MHC, HET-E (heterokaryon incompatibility) and TP1 (telomerase-associated protein 1)
- LRR – leucine-rich repeat, a term also included within the term "NLR", for nucleotide-binding domain, leucine-rich repeat"
- PYD – PYRIN domain, named after the pyrin proteins.

Available cryogenic electron microscopy (cryo-EM) structures suggest that in its inactive state, NLRP3 forms a ring- or disc-shaped oligomer in which the LRRs interact to form a cage that protects the PYDs. On activation, it is thought that NLRP3 undergoes a conformational change that exposes the PYDs, and the PYD of NLRP3 then interacts with the PYD of an adaptor protein known as apoptosis-associated speck-like protein containing a CARD (ASC). Proteins containing the caspase recruitment domain, CARD, have been shown to be widely involved in inflammation and immune response.

== Activation Mechanisms ==
NLRP3 activation occurs in response to danger signals — PAMPs (such as viral RNA or proteins), DAMPs (such as crystalline uric acid or extracellular ATP released by damaged cells), or other homeostatic disruptions. However, there is currently no unifying mechanism of activation, and it is unclear if NLRP3 binds a specific ligand or responds more generally to a loss of homeostasis.

Many different activation and regulatory mechanisms have been identified for context-dependent NLRP3 activation. In the absence of an activating signal, some studies have suggested that NLRP3 is kept in an inactive state complexed with HSP90 and SGT1 in the cytoplasm. Under certain circumstances, NLRP3 can be primed for activation by a decrease in intracellular potassium (K^{+}) levels caused by efflux from mechanosensitive ion channels located in the cell membrane. However, other triggers induce NLRP3 activation through K^{+}-independent immune signaling, suggesting this is not a universal mechanism. Reactive oxygen species (ROS) can also contribute to activation, though the precise mechanisms of such regulation has not been determined. It is likely that activation involves several organelles, including the mitochondria and trans-Golgi network, but a comprehensive overall picture of NLRP3 organelle dynamics has not yet emerged. Post-translational modifications also play a role in the regulation of NLRP3. The best-known of these is phosphorylation by NIMA-related kinase 7 (NEK7), which is essential for NLRP3 activation in mice, though not in humans.

Regardless of the specific activation mechanism, the activation of NLRP3 allows it to bind the adaptor protein ASC to form a caspase-1-activating complex known as the NLRP3 inflammasome.

== Function ==
NLRP3 functions primarily through its inflammasome. ASC is thought to act as an adaptor protein, oligomerizing into a fibril that extends from the center of the NLRP3 ring to yield complexes ~1 μm in diameter. This structure then nucleates the other components of the inflammasome.

The C-terminal CARDs of fibrillar ASC bind procaspase-1 molecules, which autoactivate by cleavage into the active protease caspase-1. NLRP3-mediated caspase-1 activation plays two major roles in innate immunity: it activates the inflammatory cytokines IL-1β and IL-18, and it activates gasdermin D. The cleaved, active subunit of gasdermin D then oligomerizes to form plasma membrane pores that preferentially release activated IL-1β and IL-18.

Besides mediating cytokine release, the NLRP3 inflammasome is also an important mediator of inflammatory, lytic cell death. When membrane pore formation and lysis occur as the end point of cell death, further cytokines and DAMPs are released, strengthening the inflammatory response. NLRP3-mediated cell death has conventionally been attributed to pyroptosis, a form of inflammatory cell death that is fully dependent on caspase-1. However, NLRP3-mediated cell death can alternatively occur through PANoptosis, a distinct innate immune, inflammatory cell death pathway initiated by innate immune sensors and driven by caspases and receptor-interacting serine/threonine-protein kinases (RIPKs) 1 and 3. NLRP3 can act as a PANoptosis sensor, but it and its inflammasome components have also been identified as components of PANoptosomes (immune complexes mediating PANoptosis) associated with the sensor molecules NLRP12, NLRC5, and ZBP1.

Through its roles in driving cytokine release and inflammatory cell death, NLRP3 is central in host defense. The NLRP3 inflammasome is activated in response to pathogens including bacteria, viruses, and fungi. For example, among bacteria, it has been suggested that NLRP3 provides protection against Staphylococcus aureus and Salmonella, and against Streptococcus pneumoniae infections by activating STAT6 and SPDEF. Among viruses, it has been associated with infection by hepatitis B virus, SARS-CoV-2, influenza virus, and human immunodeficiency virus (HIV).

Beyond infection, NLRP3 also mediates the death of cancerous cells in some contexts, including in some studies of colorectal cancer, and a study of hepatocellular carcinoma found the components of the NLRP3 inflammasome are downregulated or absent.

== Pathology ==
Despite the beneficial functions of the NLRP3 inflammasome, dysregulation is associated with pathogenesis in a wide range of diseases and cancer. In particular, mutations in the NLRP3 gene result in autoactive inflammasomes — indeed, NLRP3 was originally discovered through its mutation that causes cryopyrin-associated periodic syndrome (CAPS), a spectrum of dominantly inherited, NLRP3-associated autoinflammatory diseases that includes familial cold autoinflammatory syndrome (FCAS), Muckle–Wells syndrome (MWS), chronic infantile neurological cutaneous and articular (CINCA) syndrome, neonatal onset multisystem inflammatory disease (NOMID), and keratoendotheliitis fugax hereditaria. In addition, dysregulated NLRP3 activity has a role in the pathogenesis of gout, hemorrhagic stroke and neuroinflammation occurring in protein-misfolding diseases such as Alzheimer's, Parkinson's, and prion diseases. Deletion of Nlrp3 or other inflammasome components has been shown to ameliorate disease in mouse models for gout, type 2 diabetes, multiple sclerosis, Alzheimer's disease, and atherosclerosis. Furthermore, during infection, overactivation of the NLRP3 inflammasome can cause excess inflammation and pathology.

In the context of cancer, studies have shown roles for NLRP3 in cancer suppression for specific malignancies, yet NLRP3 and the NLRP3 inflammasome are positively associated with tumorigenesis in other cancers. For example, high NLRP3 and/or NLRP3 inflammasome expression has been observed in cancerous tissue in pancreatic ductal adenocarcinoma (PDAC), melanoma cells, acute myeloid leukemia, and other cancer types.

== Inhibition ==
Through its widespread roles in driving cell death, inflammation, and pathogenesis, the NLRP3 inflammasome has garnered attention as a potential drug target for a variety of diseases underpinned by inflammation, and numerous inhibitors have been investigated. The diarylsulfonylurea MCC950 was considered particularly promising as a potent and selective NLRP3 inhibitor that is able to lock the inactive NLRP3 structure. However, Phase II clinical trials identified possible signs of liver toxicity. Nodthera and Inflazome, have entered phase I clinical trials, and Dapansutrile (OLT1177), a β-sulfonyl nitrile molecule compound developed by Olactec Therapeutics, has been evaluated in clinical trials as a selective NLRP3 inhibitor for treating heart failure, osteoarthritis and gouty arthritis. Ruvonoflast (NT-0796) is another NLRP3 inhibitor being developed by Nodthera that is currently in clinical trials. No inhibitor has yet been approved for clinical use.

An alternative approach to inhibiting NLRP3 is to inhibit its upstream activation or downstream signaling. For example, the metabolite β-hydroxybutyrate has been shown to block NLRP3-mediated inflammatory disease in preclinical models by preventing K^{+} efflux. Other inhibitors to target gasdermin D and IL-1β have also been evaluated, and IL-1β blockade has proven to be clinically efficacious in a number of diseases, particularly CAPS. There remains an urgent need to identify effective inhibitors that can be used in larger patient populations. Efforts to target NLRP3 and its inflammatory mediators have gained considerable momentum, and the development of new inhibitors remains a dynamic field.
