= Erich Sackmann =

German biophysicist (1934–2024)

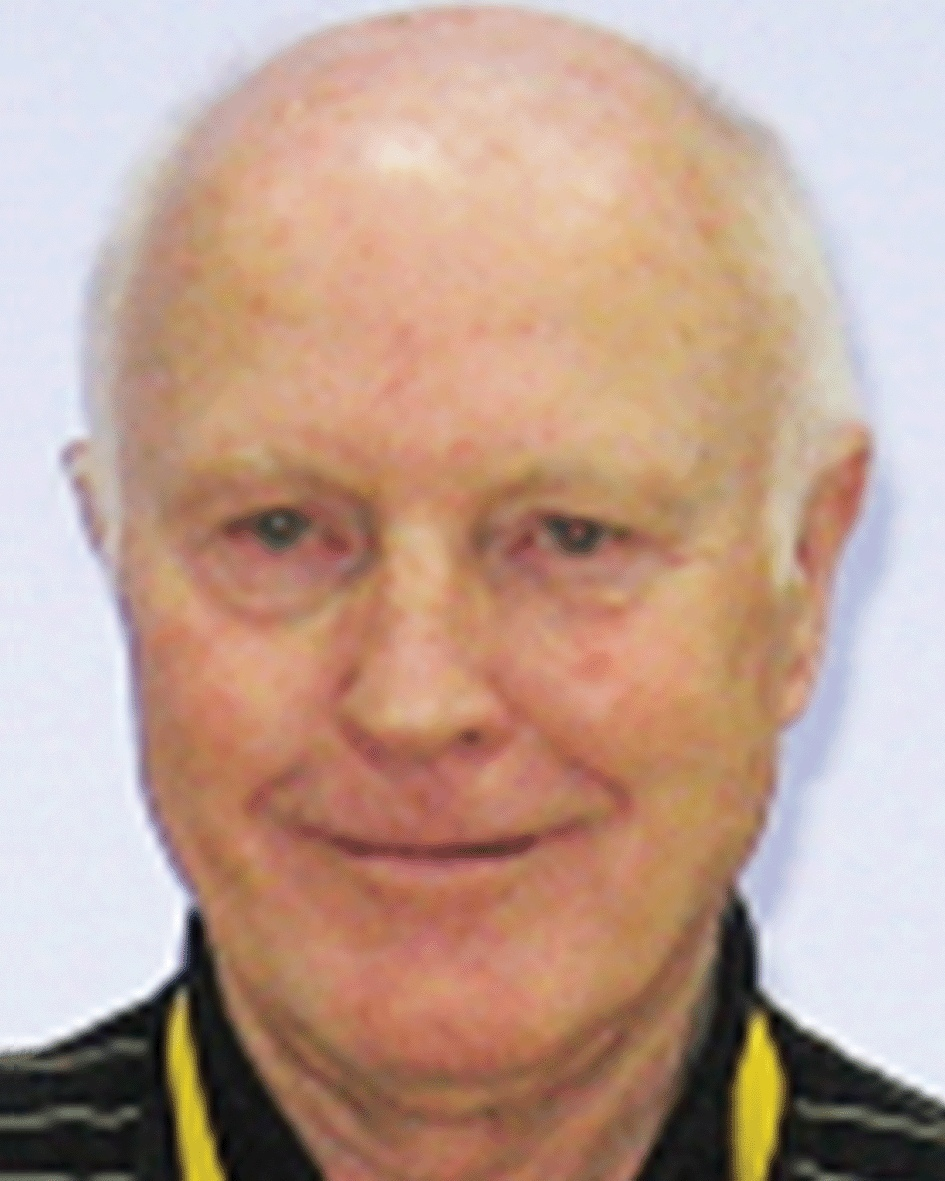
- Born: 26 November 1934 (age 91); Baiersbronn, Germany
- Education: University of Stuttgart
- Scientific career
- Fields: Biophysics
- Thesis: Untersuchung der indirekten Kernspinkopplung zwischen Protonen und Kohlenstoff-13 (1964)

Erich Sackmann (26 November 1934 – 29 May 2024) was a German experimental physicist and a pioneer of biophysics in Europe.

== Education ==
Sackmann obtained his MSc (1961) and PhD (1964) degrees from the University of Stuttgart in the group of Theodor Förster.

== Career ==
Following the awarding of his PhD, Sackmann then spent two years at Bell Telephone Laboratories in Murray Hill, New Jersey, and six years at Max Planck Institute for Biophysical Chemistry in Göttingen, Germany. Between 1974 and 1980 he was professor of physics and head of the biophysics department at Universität Ulm, and from 1980 until retirement in 2003 he held the same positions at the Physics Department of the Technical University of Munich.

=== Research ===
Sackmann dedicated a lifetime of research towards probing the living cell with tools of physics, long before biophysics was the mode of the day. Considered as a father of biophysics in Europe, he pioneered, along with others, the idea of a "bottom up" approach towards understanding the cell – starting from relatively simple systems like lipid bilayers, giant vesicles and actin in solution and going towards more and more complex systems to reach eventually an understanding at the level of the entire cell.

More than 200 publications and several books Literatur von und über Erich Sackmann testify to his contributions to soft matter and biophysics. His early work was mainly on lyotropic liquid crystals and lipid membranes. Later, along with his students he laid the foundations of our current understanding of membrane adhesion. Over the years, his team developed and improved the technique of reflection interference contrast microscopy – RICM (which is quantitative interference reflection microscopy – IRM) – a powerful tool to probe adhesion of membranes and thin films. Collaborations with theoreticians like Reinhard Lipowsky, Udo Seifert and Robijn Bruinsma have led to seminal works on adhesion of cell mimetic giant vesicles.

Another of his interests was the cytoskeleton and its dynamics. To study cytoskeletal dynamics, his team developed magnetic tweezers capable of exerting very small pulling forces. He contributed to our understanding of the dynamics of single actin filaments, actin networks as well as intact living cells.

His research interests included: physics of self assembly and function of artificial and biological membranes, viscoelastic microscopy of cells, physics of the actin based cytoskeleton: micro-rheology of macromolecular networks, applications of solid-supported lipid-protein membranes, ultrathin hydrated polymer layers and polymer/membrane composite films and neutron reflectivity as a new tool to study the self assembly of membrane associated proteins.

== Selected bibliography ==
Along with Reinhard Lipowsky, he authored The Structure and Dynamics of Membranes. With Rudolf Merkel, he published Lehrbuch der Biophysik – a text book on biophysics aimed at students and researchers.

== Awards and honors ==
He was elected a fellow of the American Physical Society in 2002. In recognition of his research work, in 2006, he was awarded the Stern-Gerlach-Medal by the DPG, German Physical Society.

== See also ==
- Lipid raft
- Interference reflection microscopy
- A. S. G. Curtis
- J. S. Ploem
