= RICM =

RICM may refer to:

- Reflection Interference Contrast Microscopy, a type of optical microscopy
- Régiment d'infanterie-chars de marine, a regiment of the French army
