= Immunological memory =

Ability of the immune system to quickly and specifically recognize an antigen

Immunological memory is the ability of the immune system to quickly and specifically recognize an antigen that the body has previously encountered and initiate a corresponding immune response. Generally, they are secondary, tertiary and other subsequent immune responses to the same antigen. The adaptive immune system and antigen-specific receptor (e.g., T-cell receptors) generation are responsible for adaptive immune memory.

After the inflammatory immune response to danger-associated antigen, some of the antigen-specific T cells and B cells persist in the body and become long-living memory T and B cells. After a second encounter with the same antigen, they recognize the antigen and mount a faster and more robust response. Immunological memory is the basis of vaccination. Emerging resources show that even the innate immune system can initiate a more efficient immune response and pathogen elimination after the previous stimulation with a pathogen, respectively with pathogen-associated molecular patterns (PAMPs) or damage-associated molecular patterns (DAMPs). Innate immune memory (also called trained immunity) is neither antigen-specific nor dependent on gene rearrangement; the different response is caused by changes in epigenetic programming and shifts in immunometabolism. Innate immune memory has been observed in invertebrates and vertebrates.

Immune memory can be lost if the corresponding memory cells die out ("immune amnesia"). For example, previously acquired immune memory can be depleted by measles in unvaccinated children, leaving them at risk of infection by other pathogens in the years after infection. This weakening of the immune system increases the risk of death from other diseases.

== Adaptive immune memory ==
The time course of an immune response. The formation of immunological memory causes a later reinfection to lead to a rapid increase in antibody production and effector T cell activity. The later infections can be mild or even unapparent.

Immunological memory occurs after a primary immune response against the antigen. Immunological memory is thus created by each individual after a previous initial exposure to a potentially dangerous agent. The course of secondary immune response is similar to the primary immune response. After the memory B cell recognizes the antigen, it presents the peptide in the MHC class II complex to nearby effector T cells. That leads to activation of these cells and rapid proliferation of cells. After the primary immune response has disappeared, the effector cells of the immune response are eliminated.

However, antibodies that were previously produced in the body persist and represent the humoral component of immunological memory and serve as an important defense against subsequent infections. In addition to the formed antibodies in the body, there remains a small number of memory T and B cells that make up the cellular component of the immunological memory. They stay in blood circulation in a resting state, and at the subsequent encounter with the same antigen, these cells are able to respond immediately and eliminate the antigen. Memory cells have a long life and last up to several decades in the body.

Immunity to chickenpox, measles, and some other diseases lasts a lifetime. Immunity to many diseases eventually wears off. The immune system's response to a few diseases, such as dengue, counterproductively worsens the next infection (antibody-dependent enhancement).

As of 2019, researchers are still trying to find out why some vaccines produce lifelong immunity, while the effectiveness of other vaccines drops to zero in less than 30 years (for mumps) or less than six months (for H3N2 influenza).

=== Memory B cells ===
Memory B cells are plasma cells that are able to produce antibodies for a long time. Unlike the naive B cells involved in the primary immune response, the memory B cell response is slightly different. The memory B cell has already undergone clonal expansion, differentiation and affinity maturation, so it is able to divide multiple times faster and produce antibodies with much higher affinity (especially IgG).

In contrast, the naive plasma cell is fully differentiated and cannot be further stimulated by antigen to divide or increase antibody production. Memory B cell activity in secondary lymphatic organs is highest during the first 2 weeks after infection. Subsequently, after 2 to 4 weeks, its response declines. After the germinal center reaction, the memory plasma cells are located in the bone marrow, which is the main site of antibody production within the immunological memory.

=== Memory T cells ===
Memory T cells can be both CD4+ and CD8+. These memory T cells do not require further antigen stimulation to proliferate; therefore, they do not need a signal via MHC. Memory T cells can be divided into two functionally distinct groups based on the expression of the CCR7 chemokine receptor. This chemokine indicates the direction of migration into secondary lymphatic organs. Those memory T cells that do not express CCR7 (these are CCR7-) have receptors to migrate to the site of inflammation in the tissue and represent an immediate effector cell population. These cells were named memory effector T cells (T_{EM}). After repeated stimulation they produce large amounts of IFN-γ, IL-4 and IL-5. In contrast, CCR7+ memory T cells lack proinflammatory and cytotoxic functions but express receptors for lymph node migration. These cells were named central memory T cells (T_{CM}). They effectively stimulate dendritic cells, and after repeated stimulation, they are able to differentiate into CCR7- effector memory T cells. Both populations of these memory cells originate from naive T cells and remain in the body for several years after initial immunization.

Experimental techniques used to study these cells include measuring antigen-stimulated cell proliferation and cytokine release, staining with peptide-MHC multimers, or using an activation-induced marker (AIM) assay.

== Innate immune memory ==
Many invertebrates such as species of freshwater snails, copepod crustaceans, and tapeworms have been observed activating innate immune memory to instigate a more efficient immune response to second encounter with specific pathogens, despite missing an adaptive branch of the immune system. RAG1-deficient mice without functional T and B cells were able to survive the administration of a lethal dose of Candida albicans when exposed previously to a much smaller amount, showing that vertebrates also retain this ability. Despite not having the ability to manufacture antibodies like the adaptive immune system, the innate immune system has immune memory properties as well. Innate immune memory—trained immunity—is defined as a long-term functional reprogramming of innate immune cells evoked by exogenous or endogenous insults and leading to an altered response towards a second challenge after returning to a non-activated state.

When innate immune cells receive an activation signal, for example, through recognition of PAMPs with pattern recognition receptors (PRRs), they start the expression of proinflammatory genes, initiate an inflammatory response, and undergo epigenetic reprogramming. After the second stimulation, the transcription activation is faster and more robust. Immunological memory was reported in monocytes, macrophages, natural killer cells, and innate lymphoid cells 1, 2, and 3 cells. Concomitantly, some nonimmune cells, for example, epithelial stem cells on barrier tissues, or fibroblasts, change their epigenetic state and respond differently after priming insult.

=== Mechanism of innate immune memory ===
At the steady state, unstimulated cells have reduced biosynthetic activities and more condensed chromatin with reduced gene transcription. The interaction of exogenous PAMPs (β-glucan, muramyl peptide) or endogenous DAMPs (oxidized LDL, uric acid) with PRR initiates a cellular response. Triggered Intracellular signaling cascades lead to the upregulation of metabolic pathways such as glycolysis, the Krebs cycle, and fatty acid metabolism. An increase in metabolic activity provides cells with energy and building blocks, which are needed for the production of signaling molecules such as cytokines and chemokines.

Signal transduction changes the epigenetic marks and increases chromatin accessibility, to allow binding of transcription factors and the start of transcription of genes connected with inflammation. There is an interplay between metabolism and epigenetic changes because some metabolites such as fumarate and acetyl-CoA can activate or inhibit enzymes involved in chromatin remodeling. After the stimulus let up, there is no need for immune factors production, and their expression in immune cells is terminated. Several epigenetic modifications created during stimulation remain. Characteristic epigenetic rewiring in trained cells is the accumulation of H3K4me3 on immune gene promoters and the increase of H3K4me1 and H3K27ac on enhancers. Additionally, cellular metabolism does not return to the state before stimulation, and trained cells remain in a prepared state. This status can last from weeks to several months and can be transmitted to daughter cells. Secondary stimulation induces a new response, which is faster and stronger.

== Evolutionary mechanisms leading to the development of immunological memory ==
=== Evolution of innate immune memory ===
Immune memory brings a major evolutionary advantage when the organism faces repeated infections. Inflammation is very costly, and increased effectivity of response accelerates pathogen elimination and prevents damage to the host's own tissue. Classical adaptive immune memory evolved in jawed vertebrates and in jawless fish (lamprey), which is approximately just 1% of living organisms. Some form of immune memory is, therefore, reported in other species. In plants and invertebrates, faster kinetics, increased magnitude of immune response, and an improved survival rate can be seen after secondary infection encounters. Immune memory is common for the vast majority of biodiversity on Earth.

It has been proposed that immune memory in innate and adaptive immunity represents an evolutionary continuum in which a more robust immune response evolved first, mediated by epigenetic reprogramming. In contrast, specificity through antigen-specific receptors evolved later in some vertebrates.

=== Right before adaptive immune memory ===
Adaptive immune memory share many fundamental parts with innate immunity and are best viewed as an elaboration of the innate system. For example, lymphoid cells can be identified in some pre-vertebrate deuterostomes (i.e., sea urchins).

The adaptive immune system evolved exactly twice, once each in the two branches of vertebrates that diverged approximately 500 million years ago, the jawed fish and the jawless fish. In both systems the adaptive lymphocytes have a division of labor functionally analogous to the B/αβT/δγT split, suggesting that their non-adaptive common ancestor already had a similar division.

=== Emergence of adaptive immune memory ===
A major event in the history of vertebrates is the two rounds of whole genome duplication (2R). There ended up being four copies of every part of the genome, making the loss and re-purposing of genes evolutionarily useful. One particular region, the primordial immune complex, gave rise to two paralogous regions of the human genome important to adaptive immunity: the Ig/TCR part of chromosome 14 and the MHC region of chromosome 9.

The 14/9 arrangement sets the stage for the adaptive system, but still lacks the ability to rearrange V(D)J exons. This ability was fortuitously gained when a RAG transposon containing the precursor to the recombination-activating genes invaded an immunoglobin and split its VJ exon into V and J. Further transposon activity and duplication lead to the many copies of V, D and J that generate antibody variation today.

The above only explains how the system arose, not why it happened despite the high energy costs and the unknown gains. It can be also reasoned that an adaptive immune memory would be more useful to longer-lived organisms than otherwise, as it relies on the accumulation of information. Furthermore, research models show that memory cell pools accrue diversity based on the number of individual pathogens exposed, even at the cost of efficiency when encountering more common pathogens: another possible cost to being adaptive.

One theory is that the benefit could really be high: early vertebrates may be large predators that use the K stragtegy, that is to make a limited amount of offsprings and a higher investment in each of them. (Vertebrates such as cod, seahorses, and axolotl all have devolved AIS and were presumably not under much pathogen stress at some point in ther lineage.) Another theory is that vertebrates have so much more metabolic activity that the cost is insignificant.

== Immune amnesia ==
=== Measles ===
The measles virus can deplete previously acquired immune memory by killing cells that make antibodies, thus weakening the immune system and increasing the risk of death from other diseases. Suppression of the immune system by measles lasts about two years and has been epidemiologically implicated in up to 90% of childhood deaths in third world countries, and historically may have caused rather more deaths in the United States, the UK and Denmark than were directly caused by measles. Although the measles vaccine contains an attenuated strain, it does not deplete immune memory.

Complications of measles are relatively common. Some are caused directly by the virus, while others are caused by viral suppression of the immune system. This phenomenon, known as "immune amnesia", increases the risk of secondary bacterial infections; two months after recovery there is an 11–73% decrease in the number of antibodies against other bacteria and viruses. Population studies from prior to the introduction of the measles vaccine suggest that immune amnesia typically lasts 2–3 years. Primate studies suggest that immune amnesia in measles is effected by replacement of memory lymphocytes with ones that are specific to measles virus, since they are destroyed after being infected by the virus. This creates lasting immunity to measles re-infection, but decreases immunity to other pathogens. Complications may be directly related to the virus - e.g. viral pneumonia or viral laryngotracheobronchitis (croup) - or related to the damage measles virus causes to tissues and the immune system. The most serious direct complications include acute encephalitis, corneal ulceration (leading to corneal scarring); and subacute sclerosing panencephalitis, a progressive and fatal inflammation of the brain that occurs in about 1 in 600 unvaccinated infants under 15 months. Common secondary infections include infectious diarrhea, bacterial pneumonia, and otitis media.

=== Immunotherapy ===
Many autoimmune diseases involve the immunological memory improperly targeting a part of the body and could be resolved if the corresponding memory is lost. CAR T cells are genetically engineered T cells that can be designed to recognize any molecule as the target, so that they can be made to kill any type of cell. A heavy-handed approach that targets every CD19, which is found on every B cell, has received much press due its fast and impressive results in systemic lupus erythematosus nephritis. There have been than 100 clinicalical trials studying the use of CAR T to kill the B cells that cause autoimmunity; some targets all B cells, some only memory B cells, and a few aiming to only kill B cells that produce a specific autoantibody.

A related technique is CAR Treg, where the regulatory type of T cells are used. Tregs do not kill cells and instead suppresses immune responses. CAR Treg cells can be designed to suppress the immune response around some organ targeted by autoimmunity.

== See also ==
- Immunity (medical)
- Seroconversion
- Serostatus
- Virgin soil epidemic
