= Mihai Netea =

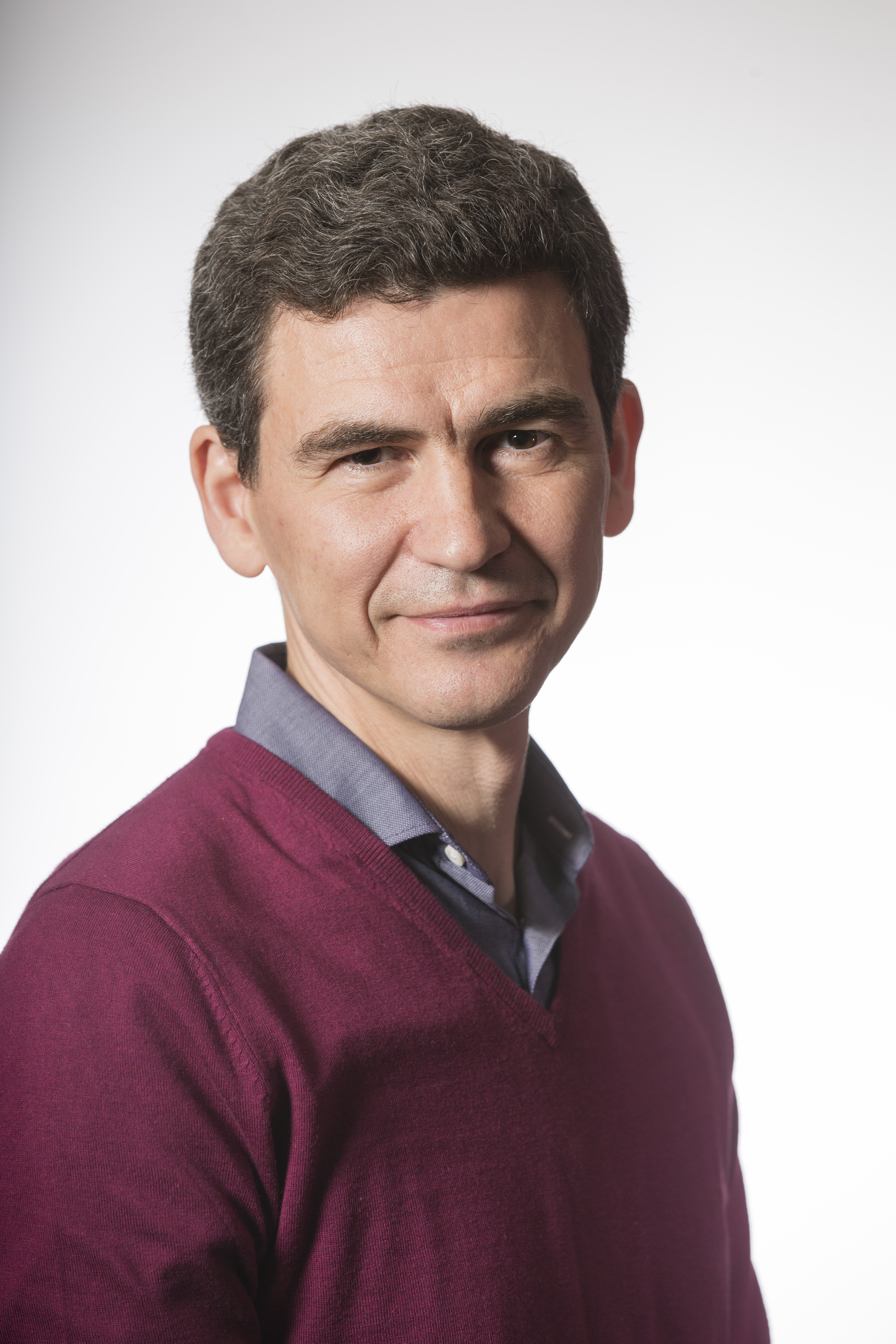
- Mihai Netea in 2016
- Born: 1968 (age 57–58); Cluj, Romania
- Education: Radboud University Nijmegen
- Occupations: physician, professor

Mihai Gheorghe Netea (born 1968, Cluj, Romania) is a Romanian-Dutch physician and professor at Radboud University Nijmegen, specialized in infectious disease, immunology, and global health.

Netea studied medicine at the Medico-Pharmaceutical Institute in Cluj-Napoca. He received a doctoral degree in 1998 at Radboud University, with a dissertation on the role of cytokines in sepsis, written under the direction of Jos van der Meer.

He joined the University of Colorado Denver as a postdoctoral researcher and then returned to conclude his clinical training as an infectious diseases specialist. Since 2008 he heads the division of Experimental Medicine, Department of Internal Medicine, Nijmegen University Nijmegen Medical Center.

Netea's field of study includes the innate immune system and its capacity to "memorize" infections, as well as its recognition of Fungi pathogens. He examined system's response to Candida albicans, a sepsis trigger. Additionally, he tried to search for genetic diseases that can make individuals more vulnerable to this type of infections.

Netea co-published more than 900 scientific papers in journals such as The New England Journal of Medicine, Nature, Science, and PNAS.

For his academic work, Netea received several grants: a Vidi grant in 2005, a Vici grant in 2010, and European Research Council Consolidator Grant in 2012. In 2016, he was awarded the Spinoza Prize. He is a member of Academia Europaea since 2015 and of the Royal Netherlands Academy of Arts and Sciences since 2016.

Netea is known for his breakthrough in the area of Trained immunity. Netea's research attempts to translate information obtained through the assessment of human genetic variation in patients into novel diagnostic and therapeutic approaches.

== Areas of research ==
- Trained immunity - The innate immune system memory
- The memory traits of innate immunity
- Pattern recognition of fungal pathogens
- Induction of antifungal immunity
- Primary immunodeficiencies in the innate immune system
- Sepsis and immunoparalysis

== Associated institutions ==
- Iuliu Hațieganu University of Medicine and Pharmacy
- Radboud University Medical Center.
- University of Colorado Denver
- University of Bonn.
- University of Medicine and Pharmacy of Craiova

== Positions held ==
- Professor of Experimental Medicine, Department of Internal Medicine, Radboud University Nijmegen Medical Centre, The Netherlands (since 2007).
- Professor of Immunometabolism, University of Bonn, Germany (since 2017).
- Professor of Immunology, University of Medicine and Pharmacy Craiova (since 2016)
- Visiting professor, University of Medicine and Pharmacy Cluj-Napoca
- Visiting scientist, Division of Infectious Diseases, University of Colorado Health Sciences Center, Denver, Colorado, United States, 2005 and 2007
- Internist-infectious diseases specialist, senior staff Department of Internal Medicine, 2006–2007
- Fellow internal medicine/infectious diseases, 2000–2005
- Post-Doc researcher, Department of Internal Medicine, Radboud University Nijmegen Medical Centre, The Netherlands, 1998–2000
- PhD training, Department Internal Medicine, Radboud Univ Nijmegen Medical Centre, The Netherlands, 1994–1998

== Prizes and awards ==
- 2016: NWO Spinoza Prize.
- 2016: Elected member KNAW
- 2015: Elected member Academia Europaea
- 2013: European Society for Clinical Investigation Award for "Translational Research"
- 2011: Radboud Science Award
- 2006: WRO Goslinsgsprijs of the Infectious Diseases Society of the Netherlands
- 2005: ICAAC Programme Committee Award in "Immunology of Infection"
- 2005: European Society of Clinical Microbiology and Infectious Diseases Young Investigator Award
- 2003: SmithKline Beecham ICAAC Award
- 2003: Postdoctoral Investigator Award, International Cytokine Society
- 2002: Dutch Society for Medical Microbiology Aventis Award
- 2002: International Sepsis Forum Young Investigator Award

== Publications ==
=== Peer-reviewed (selection) ===
- M.G. Netea (1998). Modulation of proinflammatory cytokines (Thesis). Radboud University Nijmegen. 419 pp. hdl:2066/146584. ISBN 90-90-11693-1.
- Bekkering S, Arts RJW, ... , Stunnenberg H, Riksen NP, Netea MG. Metabolic Induction of Trained Immunity through the Mevalonate Pathway. Cell. 2018; 172: pages 135-146 (impact fact0r 28.7)
- Mitroulis I, Ruppova K, Wang B, ... , Hajishengallis G, Netea MG, Chavakis T. Modulation of Myelopoiesis Progenitors Is an Integral Component of Trained Immunity. Cell. 2018; 172: pages 147-161 (28.7).
- Arts RJW, Moorlag SJCFM, Novakovic B, ... , Stunnenberg HG, van Crevel R, Netea MG. BCG Vaccination Protects against Experimental Viral Infection in Humans through the Induction of Cytokines Associated with Trained Immunity. Cell Host Microbe 2018; 23: paages 89-100 (13.4)
- Ter Horst R, Jaeger M, Smeekens SP, ... , Wijmenga C, Notebaart RA, Joosten LA, Netea MG. Host and Environmental Factors Influencing Individual Human Cytokine Responses. Cell. 2016;167: pages 1111-1124 (28.7)
- Li Y, Oosting M, Smeekens SP, Jaeger M, ... , Wijmenga C, Kumar V, Netea MG. A Functional Genomics Approach to Understand Variation in Cytokine Production in Humans. Cell. 2016;167: pages 1099-1110 (28.7)
- Schirmer M, Smeekens SP, Vlamakis H, ... , Wijmenga C, Netea MG, Xavier RJ. Linking the Human Gut Microbiome to Inflammatory Cytokine Production Capacity. Cell. 2016;167: pages 1125-1136 (28.7)
- Netea MG, Joosten LA, Latz E, Mills KH, Natoli G, Stunnenberg HG, O'Neill LA, Xavier RJ. Trained immunity: A program of innate immune memory in health and disease. Science. 2016 April 22;352(6284):aaf1098 (31.4)
- Cheng SC, Brendon S, ... , van der Poll, Netea MG. Broad defects in energy metabolism of leukocytes underlie immunoparalysis in sepsis. Nature Immunology, 2016, 17: pages 406-413 (21.7)
- Cheng SC, Quintin J, Cramer RA, ... , Stunnenberg HG, Xavier RJ, Netea MG. mTOR/HIF1a-mediated aerobic glycolysis as metabolic basis for trained immunity. Science, 2014, 345: page 1250684 (31.4)
- Saeed S, Quintin J, Kerstens HHD, ... , Xavier RJ, Logie C, Netea MG, Stunnenberg HG. Epigenetic programming during monocyte to macrophage differentiation and trained innate immunity. Science, 2014, 345: page 1251086 (31.4)
- Li Y, Oosting M, Deelen P, Ricaño-Ponce I, Smeekens S, Jaeger M, Matzaraki V, Swertz MA, Xavier RJ, Franke L, Wijmenga C, Joosten LA, Kumar V, Netea MG. Inter-individual variability and genetic influences on cytokine responses to bacteria and fungi. Nature Medicine. 2016 July 4. doi: 10.1038/nm.4139 (30)
- Kumar V, Cheng SC, Johnson MD, ... , Xavier RJ, Kullberg BJ, Wijmenga C, Netea MG. Immunochip SNP array identifies novel genetic variants conferring susceptibility to candidemia. Nature Communications, 2014, 5: page 4675 (10.7)
- Laayouni H, Oosting M, Luisi P, ... , Joosten LAB, Bertranpetit J, Netea MG. Convergent evolution in European and Rroma populations: pressure exerted by plague on Toll-like receptors. Proceedings of the National Academy of Sciences of the United States of America, 2014, 111: pages 2668-73 (9.8)
- Lionakis M, Swamydas M, Fischer B, ..., Gao JL, Kullberg BJ, Netea MG, Murphy PM. Chemokine Receptor CX3CR1 Modulates Susceptibility to Systemic Candidiasis in Mice and Humans. Journal of Clinical Investigation 2013; 123(12): pages 5035-51 (13.9)
- Smeekens SP, Ng A, ... van der Meer JW, Wijmenga C, Netea MG, Xavier RJ. Functional genomics identifies type I interferon pathway as central for host defense against Candida albicans. Nature Communications 2013;4: page 1342 (10.0)
- Kleinnijenhuis J, Quintin J, Preijers F, Joosten L.A.B., Ifrim DC, Saeed S, Jacobs C, van Loenhout J, de Jong D, Stunnenberg HG, Xavier RJ, van der Meer JWM, van Crevel R, Netea MG. BCG induces NOD2-dependent non-specific protection to reinfection via epigenetic reprogramming of monocytes. Proceedings of the National Academy of Sciences of the United States of America 2012, pages 17537-42 (9.4) 17. van de Veerdonk FL, Plantinga TS, Hoischen A, Smeekens SP, Joosten LA, Gilissen C, Arts P, Rosentul DC, Carmichael AJ, Smits-van der Graaf CA, Kullberg BJ, van der Meer JW, Lilic D, Veltman JA, Netea MG. STAT1 mutations in autosomal dominant chronic mucocutaneous candidiasis. The New England Journal of Medicine 2011 July 7;365(1): pages 54-61 (47)
- Netea MG, Quintin J, van der Meer JW. Trained immunity: a memory for innate host defense. Cell Host Microbe.19;9: pages 355-61. (13.4).
- Bart Ferwerda, Gerben Ferwerda, Theo S. Plantinga, ... , Bart-Jan Kulberg, Gordon D. Brown, Netea MG. Human dectin-1 deficiency and mucocutaneous fungal infections The New England Journal of Medicine, 2009, 361;1760-7 (47)
- Netea MG, Gow NA, Munro CA, ... , Van der Meer JW, Brown AJ, Kullberg BJ. Immune sensing of Candida albicans requires cooperative recognition of mannans and glucans by lectin and Toll-like receptors. Journal of Clinical Investigation 2006 June;116(6): pages 1642-50. (15.7)

=== Popular science ===
- Netea, M. (2022). O istorie genetică (incompletă) a românilor [An (incomplete) genetic history of the Romanians] (in Romanian). Humanitas, Bucharest.

=== Science-fiction ===
- Netea, M.G. (2015). North-West Passage to the Moon. CreateSpace Independent Publishing Platform, ISBN 1515367398

== Research grants ==
- 2002-2005 Junior researcher grant "The role of Toll-like receptors for recognition of Candida albicans" (250.000 euro)
- 2004-2009 Vidi Grant of the Netherlands Association for Scientific Research (600.000 euro).
- 2004-2007 Junior researcher grant "Pattern recognition receptors in disseminated candidiasis" (250.000 euro)
- 2007-2011 TI-Pharma consortium grant (500.000 euro).
- 2006-2009 Junior researcher grant "Adjuvants for Candida vaccination" (250.000 euro)
- 2006-2010 Diabetes Fonds grant "The role of interleukin-18 for glucose metabolism" (250.000 euro)
- 2008-2012 FIN-SysB Marie Curie grant (EU-FP7), for "Systems Biology of Candida albicans" (500.000 euro)
- 2009-2013 CTMM grant "Molecular Diagnosis and Risk Stratification of Sepsis (MARS)" (500.000 euro)
- 2009-2012 Junior researcher grant "Genetic susceptibility to invasive fungal infections" (250.000 euro)
- 2010-2015 Vici Grant of the Netherlands Association for Scientific Research (1.500.000 euro).
- 2011-2014 All-FUN research grant (EU-FP7), for "Immunology of Fungal Infections" (300.000 euro)
- 2012-2017 ERC Consolidator Grant, for Systems Biology of Fungal Infections (1.5 million euro)
- 2013-2018 CVON grant, "Gut microbiota and chronic inflammation as drivers of cardiovascular disease (1.100.000 euro)
- 2015-2019 TOP grant "The role of cellular metabolism of immune cells for the pathogenesis of sepsis" (337.000 euro)
- 2016-2019 REPROGRAM Horizon 2020 grant, on the role of trained immunity in cardiovascular diseases (900.000 euro)
- 2016-2020 Spinoza Prize for research on trained innate immunity (2.500.000 euro).
- 2016-2020 Collaborative Project Romanian Government for research on genomics in sepsis (2.000.000 euro)
- 2017-2021 HDHL-INTIMIC "Interrelation of the Intestinal Microbiome, Diet and Health" (400.000 euro)

== Patents ==
- EP2076282 – Novel antagonists of the Toll-like receptor 4.
- EP6030245 - Novel method for diagnosing Lyme disease using a cellular immunological test (licensed)
- EP6031158 – A novel method for diagnosing Q-fever using a cellular immunological test (licensed)
- US61/933,716 - Tumor necrosis factor alpha detection in whole blood samples (licensed)
- US14/760,604 – Galactosaminogalactan for use in the treatment of at least one inflammatory disease Filed November 2017 – Targeted nanoimunotherapy to increase trained immunity
