= Jos van der Meer =

Dutch scientist

Jos W.M. van der Meer
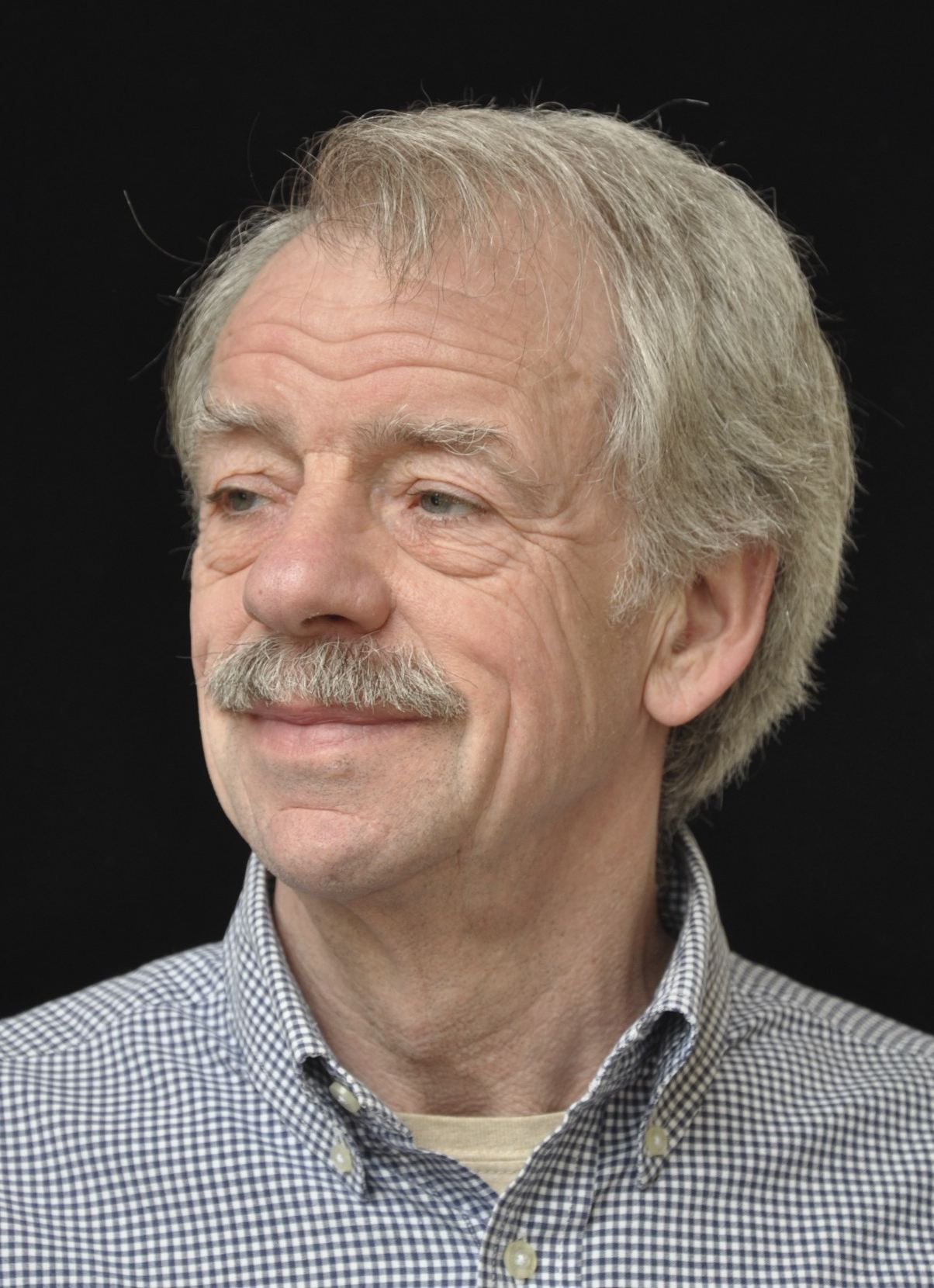
- Jos W.M. van der Meer, 2010
- Born: April 15, 1947 (age 79); The Hague, Netherlands
- Education: Leiden University
- Scientific career
- Fields: Medicine; Infectious diseases
- Workplaces: Radboud University Nijmegen Medical Centre
- Doctoral advisor: Ralph van Furth
- Other academic advisors: Charles A. Dinarello
- Doctoral students: J. S. Ploem
- Other notable students: Mihai G. Netea

Jos W.M. van der Meer (born April 15, 1947) is emeritus professor and former chairman at the department of internal medicine of the Radboud University Nijmegen Medical Centre in Nijmegen, Netherlands. He is a member of the Royal Netherlands Academy of Arts and Sciences (since 2003), of which he was vice president and chairman of the division of natural sciences (2006-2012). He is a member of Academia Europaea. Between 2014 and 2016 he was president of European Academies Science Advisory Council (EASAC). He performs research on cytokines and host defence, chronic fatigue syndrome and hyper-immunoglobulinemia D syndrome (HIDS). He is also active in graphic art and makes cartoons, for example for the Dutch science journal Mediator.

== History ==
In 1984, van der Meer published the first paper about HIDS, the new "periodic fever" syndrome he had discovered. This was the start of his research on interleukin-1 (IL-1) and his collaboration with Dr. Charles A. Dinarello, to find out whether this was an IL-1 disease. In the early 1990s together with his former PhD student Joost PH Drenth, he collected data on HIDS patients in the Netherlands and abroad and characterised the inflammatory response in HIDS (increased IL-1β production of the white blood cells). In 1999, Drenth and van der Meer could establish – together with the group of Dr. Marc Delpech in Paris – that the syndrome was due to mutations of the gene encoding for mevalonate kinase, an enzyme in the cholesterol synthesis pathway. Independently – and at the same time – the group of Professor Ronald Wanders (Amsterdam), also found this genetic defect.

Together with Anna Simon and Joost Drenth he established that HIDS should be considered an auto-inflammatory syndrome. Some 5 years ago, his group discovered that recombinant interleukin-1 receptor antagonist (IL-1RA, anakinra) is effective as a treatment for HIDS. This finding not only provides patients with an effective therapy, but also provides further proof that HIDS is an interleukin-1 disease.

Since 1987, van der Meer worked on the role of cytokines in health and inflammatory disease. The work started in Boston and was continued in Nijmegen. In the years to follow, Bart-Jan Kullberg (1992), Mihai Netea (1994) and Leo AB Joosten (2007) joined the group. Major findings of the group are:

- Interleukin-1 (IL-1) stimulates host defence against infection through interference with lethal cytokinaemia
- Hyperlipoproteinaemia defends the host against Gram-negative bacterial infection, but not against fungal infection.
- Toll-like receptor 2 stimulation predisposes for IL-10 production and induction of T regulatory lymphocytes
- Bartonella lipopolysaccharide is a non-toxic, complete blocker of Toll-like receptor 4 (TLR4)
- The fungal pathogen Candida albicans exhibits a series of molecular patterns that are recognised by different pattern recognition receptors.
- The macrophage mannose receptor strongly induces IL-17 in response to Candida albicans
- The processing of IL-1beta is not exclusively dependent on caspase-1; enzymes like PR3 are also important in vivo.
- Contrary to the current dogma, it is clear that caspase-1 is readily present in monocytes and exsudate macrophages
- During the migration of humans out of Africa, evolutionary pressure (probably exerted by prevalent infections) has led to profound changes in the occurrence of TLR4 polymorphisms
- Deficiency of dectin-1 leads to increased susceptibility to mucocutaneous fungal infection
- Reactive oxygen species enhance the production of IL-1beta.
- Together with Mihai Netea he introduced a new paradigm, the concept of trained immunity, in which monocytes and macrophages undergo epigenetic reprogramming leading to enhanced effector function of these cells.

As a clinician confronted with patients with chronic fatigue syndrome (CFS), van der Meer was intrigued by their suffering. Since 1989 together with Gijs Bleijenberg and Jochem MD Galama, he performed research trying to understand CFS. Major findings are:

- There is no evidence for a role of persistent infection (such as enteroviral infection, Epstein Barr virus infection, and as most recently established XMRV infection) In a television interview since Lo et al. he has admitted that the positive study was earthshaking.
- There are important perpetuating psychological factors, which can be addressed with cognitive behaviour therapy(CBT)
- Successful CBT means recovery
- CFS seems to be a central disorder of bodily perception
- Fluoxetine, nutritional supplements, Acclydine and Ondansetron are not effective in CFS (based on our RCTs)
- There is a loss of grey matter in the brain of CFS patients and this is at least partially reversible with successful CBT.

Concerned about the increasing antimicrobial resistance in the world, he was one of the founders (and first chairman) of the Dutch working group on antibiotic policy, SWAB, which receives long-term support from the Ministry of Health in the Netherlands. At the European level, he was a co-founder and first chairman of the ESGAP (ESCMID study group on antimicrobial policy).

Since 1990, van der Meer is involved with biomedical research development and capacity building in Indonesia (first in Semarang, later in Jakarta and Bandung). In 2004, together with Andre JAM van der Ven, he took the initiative to establish PRIOR (Poverty Related Infection Oriented Research), a virtual collaborative centre in which research groups in Jakarta and Bandung in Indonesia (Professor Sangkot Marzuki), KCMC Moshi, Tanzania (Professor Shao), Nijmegen (Professor AJAM van der Ven), Leiden (Professor Tom Ottenhoff), Maastricht (Professor Harm Hospers), RIVM Bilthoven (Professor Dick van Soolingen), and Wageningen (Professor Clive West †) work together in the combat of poverty-related infections (especially HIV infection and tuberculosis).

== Awards ==
- 1983: WRO Goslings award for Infectious diseases
- 1988: Bronze medal of Leiden University Medical Centre
- 1994: Marie Curie Award of the European Association of Nuclear Medicine*
- 1997: International ME Award*
- 1997: Honorary Fellow of the Royal College of Physicians (London)
- 1998: Marco de Vries award*
- 2003: Eijkman medal of the Eijkman Graduate School Infection & Immunity, Utrecht
- 2003: Knight in the Order of the Lion of the Netherlands
- 2003: Member of the Royal Netherlands Academy of Arts and Sciences (KNAW)
- 2004: Medal of the Medical Faculty of Diponegoro University Semarang, Indonesia
- 2005: University Medal of the Diponegoro University Semarang, Indonesia
- 2007: Honorary Fellow of the Royal College of Physicians (Edinburgh)
- 2008: Alliance for the Prudent Use of Antibiotics (APUA) Leadership Award*
- 2009: Member of the Academia Europaea
- 2010: Silver medal of the Radboud University Nijmegen
- 2011: Gold Hijmans van den Bergh medal (of the Dutch society for internal medicine)
- 2018: Gebroeders Bruinsma Erepenning

-*Together with others
