= Sankenbachsee =

Lake in Germany

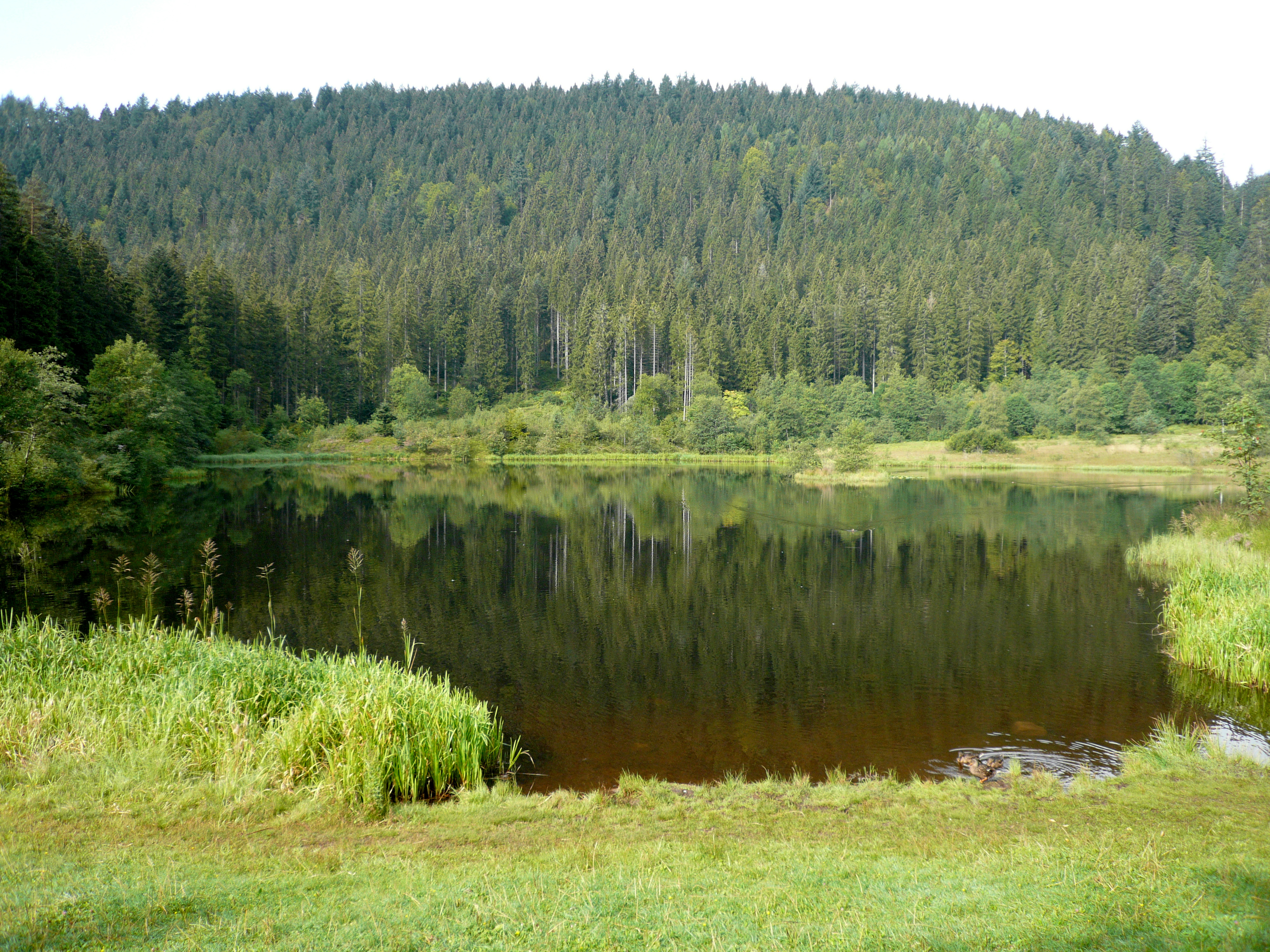

- Location within Baden-Württemberg
- Location: Baiersbronn, Freudenstadt, Northern Black Forest, Baden-Württemberg, Germany
- Coordinates: 48.484016°N 8.338444°E
- Primary inflows: Sankenbach Waterfalls
- Primary outflows: Sankenbach → Forbach → Murg
- Surface area: 2.27 ha (5.6 acres)
- Max. depth: 5 m (16 ft)

The Sankenbachsee is a tarn southwest of Baiersbronn in the Black Forest in southwestern Germany. The Sankenbach stream flows through the lake. In the 1980s a low weir was built at the outflow of the Sankenbach which protects the lake from silting up.

Sankenbachsee is a cirque lake (Karsee) formed during the last Ice Age, created by glacial erosion. It lies in a steep, bowl-shaped valley typical of glacial landscapes in the Black Forest.

The nearby Sankenbach Waterfalls feed the lake and are a popular hiking destination. This makes the area a combined lake, waterfall ecosystem, which is relatively uncommon in compact Alpine-style terrain.
