= Mevalonate kinase =

Mammalian protein found in Homo sapiens

Mevalonate Kinase
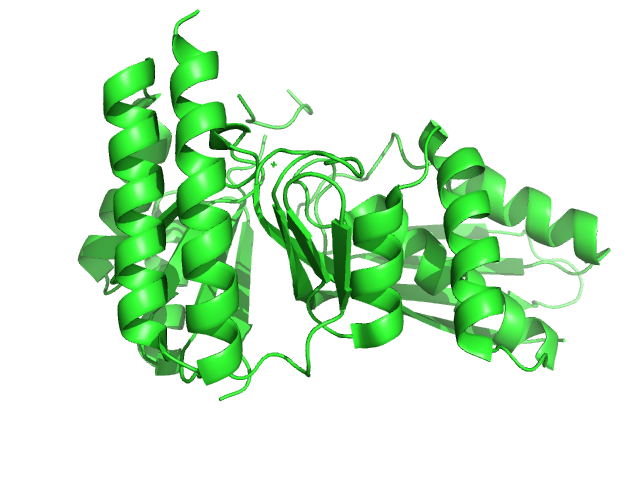
- Crystallographic structure of mevalonate kinase from Staphylococcus aureus.

Identifiers
- EC no.: 2.7.1.36
- CAS no.: 9026-52-2

Databases
- BRENDA: enzyme data
- ExPASy: NiceZyme view
- KEGG: enzyme entry
- MetaCyc: metabolic pathway
- Rhea: reactions
- PDB structures: RCSB PDB PDBe PDBsum
- Gene Ontology: AmiGO / QuickGO
Search
- PMC: articles
- PubMed: articles
- NCBI: proteins

MVK
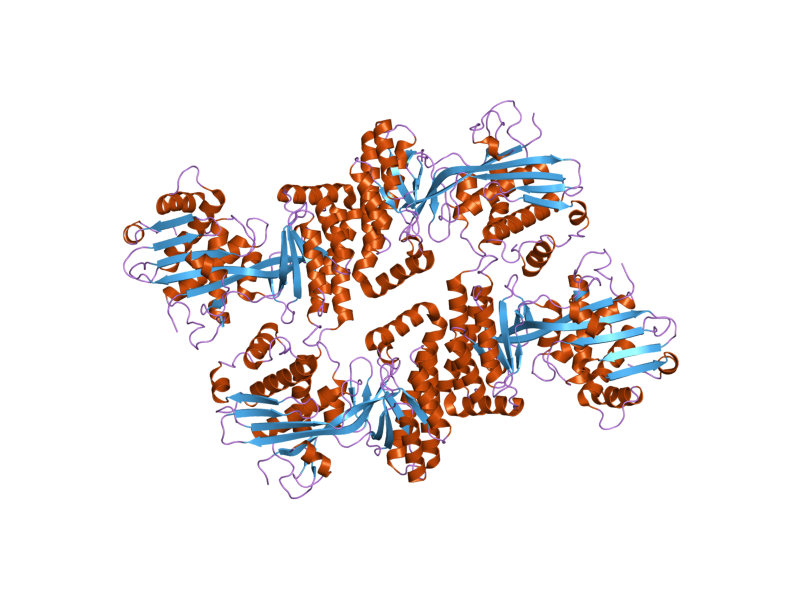

Identifiers
- Aliases: MVK, LRBP, MK, MVLK, POROK3, mevalonate kinase
- External IDs: OMIM: 251170, 260920, 610377, 175900; MGI: 107624; GeneCards: MVK
Available structures
PDB	Ortholog search: PDBe RCSB
PDB	List of PDB id codes 2R3V
Enzyme activity
EC #	BRENDA	ExPASy	KEGG	MetaCyc
2.7.1.36	↗	↗	↗	↗

Gene location (Human)
Chr.	Chromosome 12 (human)
Band	12q24.11	Start	109,573,255 bp
Band	12q24.11	End	109,598,125 bp

Gene location (Mouse)
Chr.	Chromosome 5 (mouse)
Band	5 F|5 55.99 cM	Start	114,582,330 bp
Band	5 F|5 55.99 cM	End	114,598,652 bp
RNA expression pattern
Bgee	Human / Mouse (ortholog); Top expressed in: right lobe of liver; C1 segment; pancreatic ductal cell; skin of leg; skin of abdomen; left testis; right testis; olfactory zone of nasal mucosa; right adrenal cortex; left adrenal cortex / Top expressed in: lip; tongue; yolk sac; Meckel's cartilage; neural tube; ventricular zone; esophagus; Ileal epithelium; entorhinal cortex; choroid plexus of fourth ventricle; More reference expression data
BioGPS	n/a
Gene ontology
Molecular function	transferase activity; nucleotide binding; kinase activity; protein binding; mevalonate kinase activity; magnesium ion binding; ATP binding; identical protein binding; metal ion binding
Cellular component	cytoplasm; cytosol; peroxisome
Biological process	steroid metabolic process; sterol biosynthetic process; phosphorylation; lipid metabolism; cholesterol metabolic process; isoprenoid biosynthetic process; cholesterol biosynthetic process; negative regulation of inflammatory response; steroid biosynthetic process; isopentenyl diphosphate biosynthetic process, mevalonate pathway; regulation of cholesterol biosynthetic process; metabolism
Sources:Amigo / QuickGO
Orthologs
Databases	NCBI: entry; OMA: entry
Species	Human	Mouse
Entrez	4598	17855
Ensembl	ENSG00000110921	ENSMUSG00000041939
UniProt	Q03426	Q9R008
RefSeq (mRNA)	NM_000431; NM_001114185; NM_001301182	NM_023556; NM_001306205
RefSeq (protein)	NP_000422; NP_001107657; NP_001288111	NP_001293134; NP_076045
Location (UCSC)	Chr 12: 109.57 – 109.6 Mb	Chr 5: 114.58 – 114.6 Mb
PubMed search
- Wikidata
View/Edit Human	View/Edit Mouse

Mevalonate kinase is an enzyme (specifically a kinase) that in humans is encoded by the MVK gene. Mevalonate kinases are found in a wide variety of organisms from bacteria to mammals. This enzyme catalyzes the following reaction:

.

ATP + (R)-mevalonate $\rightleftharpoons$ ADP + (R)-5-phosphomevalonate

== Function ==
Mevalonate is a key intermediate, and mevalonate kinase a key early enzyme, in isoprenoid and sterol synthesis. As the second enzyme in the Mevalonate pathway, it catalyzes the phosphorylation of Mevalonic acid to produce Mevalonate-5-phosphate. A reduction in mevalonate kinase activity to around 5-10% of its typical value is associated with the mevalonate kinase deficiency (MVD) resulting in accumulation of intermediate mevalonic acid.

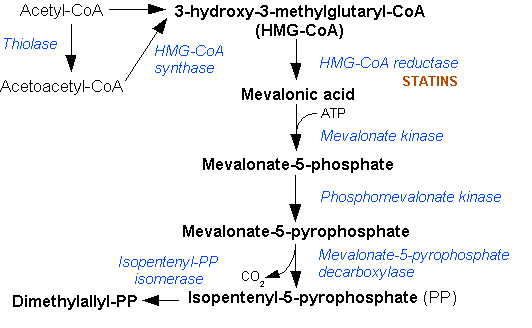
Mevalonate pathway

== Clinical significance ==
Defects can be associated with hyperimmunoglobulinemia D with recurrent fever.

Mevalonate kinase deficiency caused by mutation of this gene results in mevalonic aciduria, a disease characterized psychomotor retardation, failure to thrive, hepatosplenomegaly, anemia and recurrent febrile crises. Defects in this gene also cause hyperimmunoglobulinaemia D and periodic fever syndrome, a disorder characterized by recurrent episodes of fever associated with lymphadenopathy, arthralgia, gastrointestinal dismay and skin rash. The symptoms of the disease typically start at infancy and may be additionally triggered by stress or bacterial infection. Children with mevalonate kinase deficiency may remain undiagnosed for a long time as there is not enough scientific data at the moment to accurately diagnose children with the disease.

== See also ==
- Mevalonic aciduria
- Mevalonic acid
