= Rinkenwall =

- Rinkenmauer
- Baiersbronn
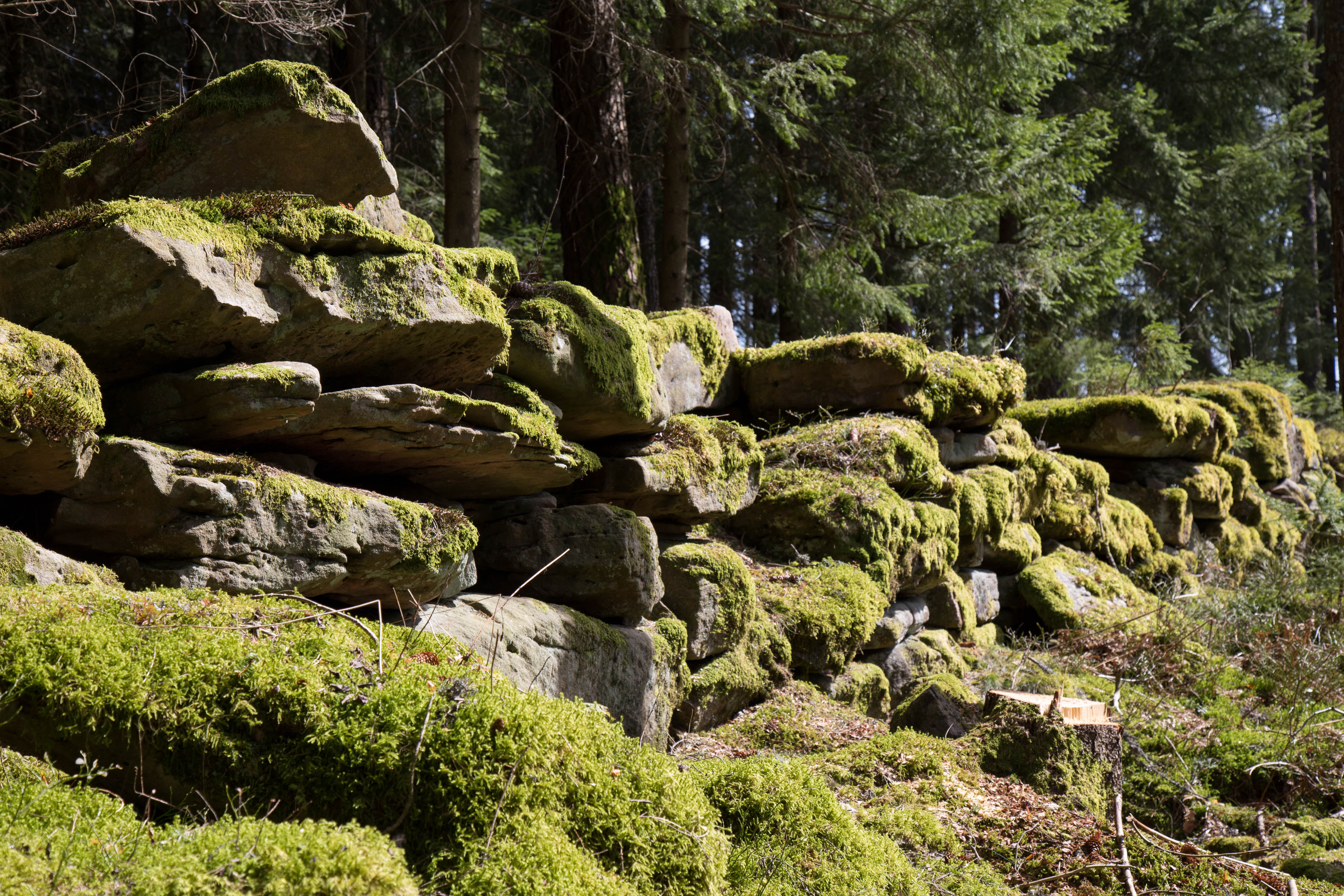
- The Rinkenwall on the Rinkenkopf

Site information
- Type: hill castle
- Code: DE-BW
- Condition: Burgstall, wall remains

Location
- Coordinates: 48°30′55″N 8°21′53″E
- Height: Height missing, see template documentation

The Rinkenwall or Rinkenmauer is a circular rampart fortification at the southeastern tip of the Rinkenkopf mountain above the Murg valley near the village of Baiersbronn in the county of Freudenstadt in the south German state of Baden-Württemberg.

The hillfort could have been a fortification built to protect Reichenbach Abbey, which was built in the late 11th century and which is named as its owner.

== History ==
The fortification is first recorded around 1100 in the gift register at Reichenbach Abbey. Here an estate is referred to as in monte qui Rincga vocatur. The word Rincga means roughly "ring-shaped", probably referring to the circular rampart (Ringwall). The donation of holdings on the Rinkenberg clearly suggests that the fortification at that time had no longer any military or administrative function.

There have been detailed descriptions since 1859. These offer various interpretations of the age of the fort and its use as a refuge castle or to protect grazing cattle. To date there have been no comprehensive excavations or finds, that would enable dating. Comparable fortifications emerged probably before A.D. 1000.

In 2006, before the erection of a transmission tower, an archaeological dig took place on part of the site. This found traces of quarrying, presumably for stone for the construction of the wall. Traces of any permanent settlement were not uncovered.

== Description ==
The 115-metre-long and 30- to 40-metre-wide circular rampart is located on the highest point of the mountain ridge. The front of the location, on its northwestern side, is 27 metres long and is interrupted by a narrow entrance. The remaining 240 metres or so of fortification runs along the rounded mountaintop and encloses an area of just under 0.4 ha.

The wall consists of stone blocks that have been piled up, of which up to five layers have survived. On the outside they reach a height of up to 1.4 metres. The wall is between 1 and 1.5 metres thick; and up to 2 metres thick on the front wall. The stone blocks are of varying size and have no evidence of being worked. Parts of the wall have been destroyed through collapse or building work.

About 50 metres in front of the entrance on the northwest side, through which a footpath passes today, is a clearance cairn, the remains of an outwork. There is no moat.

== Literature ==
- Christoph Morrissey, Dieter Müller: Die Rinkenmauer bei Baiersbronn. In: Atlas archäologischer Geländedenkmäler in Baden-Württemberg. Vol. 2, Issue 19, Konrad Theiss Verlag, Stuttgart, 2006, ISBN 978-3-8062-2088-9.
