= Rinkenkopf =

Mountain in Germany

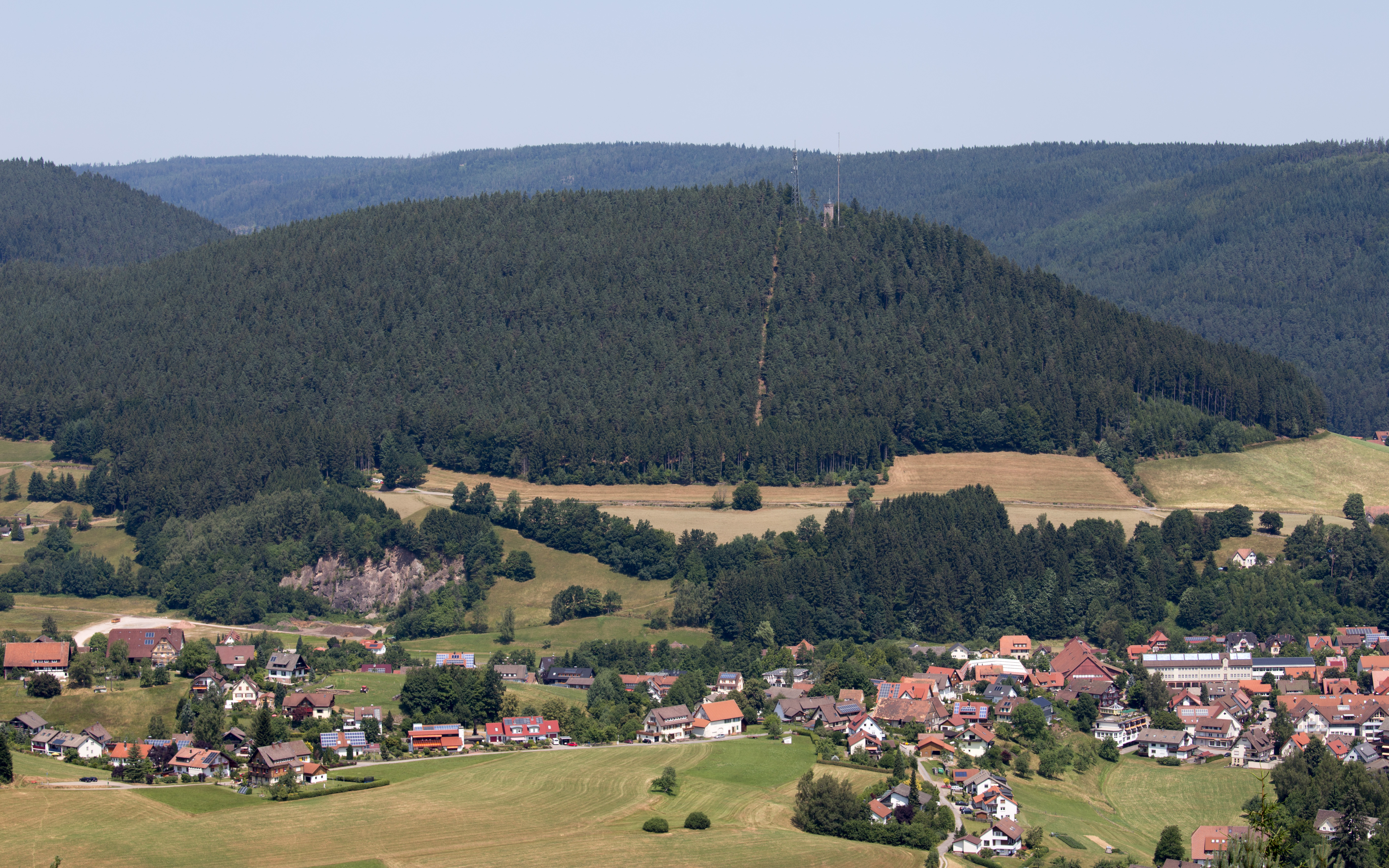
- View of the Rinkenkopf from the Stöckerkopf

Highest point
- Elevation: 759.6 m above sea level (NHN) (2,492 ft)
- Coordinates: 48°30′56″N 8°21′51″E

Geography
- Location within Baden-Württemberg
- Location: Baden-Württemberg, Germany
- Parent range: Northern Black Forest

The Rinkenkopf is a mountain, 760 m high, on the territory of Baiersbronn in the Northern Black Forest. The wooded mountain ridge is bounded in the south by the Murg valley and in the northeast by the valley of the Tonbach. To the northwest a roughly 50-metre-deep saddle (the Sattelei) separates it from the foothills of the Grindenschwarzwald.

On the mountain are the Rinkenwall (Rinkenmauer), Rinken Tower (Rinkenturm) and two transmission towers. Several hiking trails lead there, including the Murgleiter and der Genießerpfad to the Sattelei Hut.

== Rinkenwall ==
At the top of the mountain are the remains of a 115-metre-long and up to 40-metre-wide circular rampart. The date it was built and its purpose are unknown. In the gift register (Schenkungsbuch) of Reichenbach Abbey is the first mention of the mountain around 1100: in monte qui Rincga vocatur. The ring-shaped earthworks were probably already in existence at this time and gave the mountain its name.

== Rinken Tower (King William Tower) ==
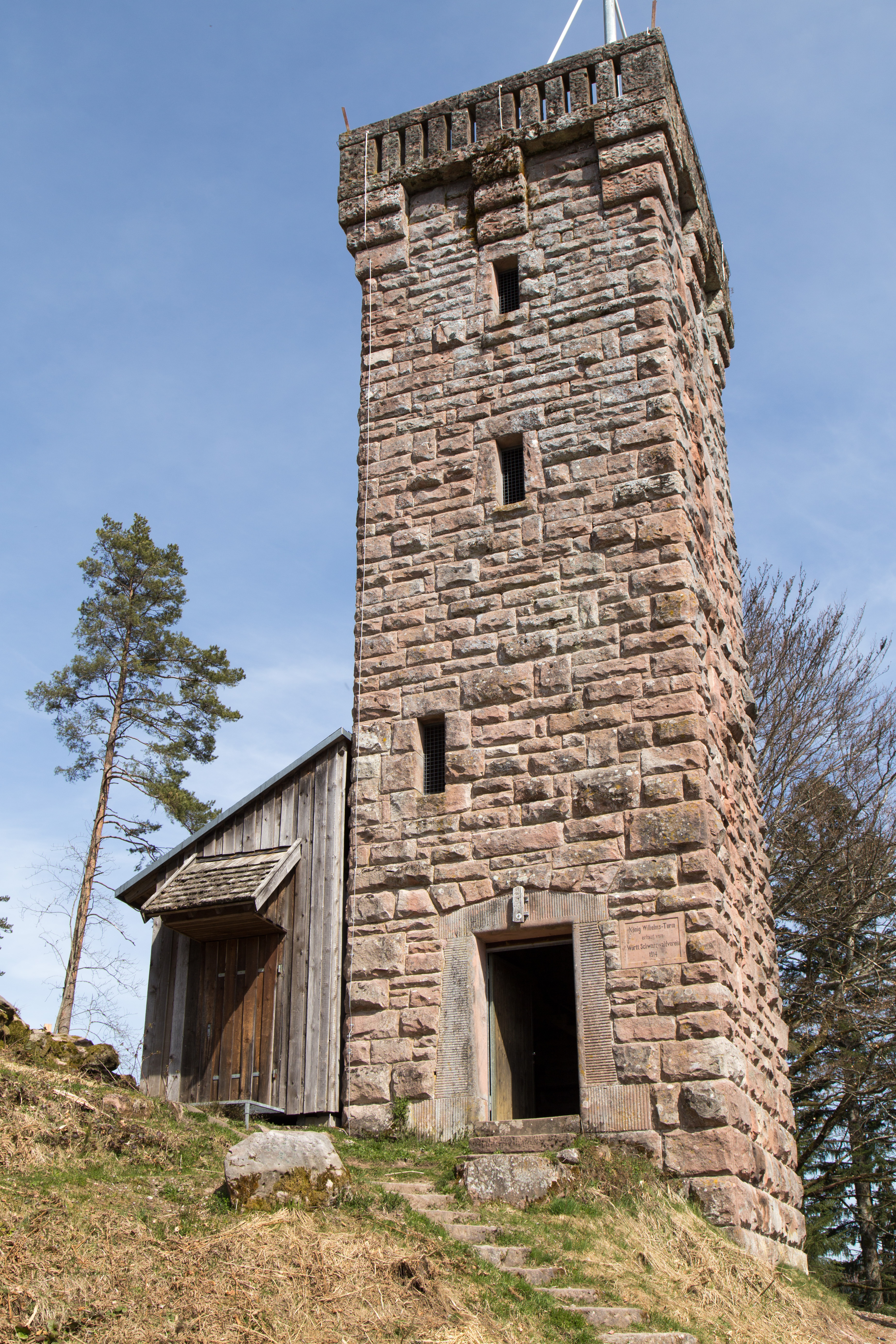
Rinken Tower

In 1914, the Württemberg Black Forest Club erected a 16-metre-high observation tower at the southeastern end of the mountain ridge. Originally named the King William Tower (König-Wilhelms-Turm) after the Württemberg king, William II, it is now known as the Rinken Tower (Rinkenturm). Since the early 1980s the tower has been owned by the municipality of Baiersbronn. It has periodically also been used as a transmission tower.
