= Trained immunity =

Trained immunity is a long-term functional modification of chromatin in cells of the innate immune system which leads to an altered response to a second, possibly unrelated, challenge. For example, the BCG vaccine leads to a reduction in childhood mortality caused by unrelated infectious agents. The term "innate immune memory" is sometimes used as a synonym for the term trained immunity which was first coined by Mihai Netea in 2011.

The term "trained immunity" is relatively new – immunological memory has previously been considered only as a part of adaptive immunity – and refers only to changes in innate immune memory of vertebrates. This type of immunity is thought to be largely mediated by epigenetic modifications. The changes to the innate immune response may last up to several months, in contrast to the classical immunological memory (which may last up to a lifetime), and is usually unspecific because there is no production of specific antibodies/receptors.

Furthermore, trained immunity has been suggested to possess a transgenerational effect, for example the children of mothers who had also received vaccination against BCG had a lower mortality rate than children of unvaccinated mothers. The BRACE trial is currently assessing if BCG vaccination can reduce the impact of COVID-19 in healthcare workers. Other vaccines are also thought to induce immune training such as the DTPw vaccine.

== Immune cells subject to training ==
Trained immunity is thought to be largely mediated by functional reprogramming of myeloid cells. One of the first described adaptive changes in macrophages were associated with lipopolysaccharide tolerance, which resulted in the silencing of inflammatory genes. Similarly, Candida albicans and fungal β-glucan trigger changes in monocyte histone methylation, this functional reprogramming eventually provides protection against reinfection. Also, a non-specific manner of protection in training with different microbial ligands was shown, for example treatment with fungal β-glucan induced protection against Staphylococcus aureus infection or CpG oligodeoxynucleotide training protecting against infectious with Escherichia coli.

Evidence of trained immunity is found mainly at monocytes/macrophages and NK cells and, less at γδ T cells and innate lymphoid cells.

=== Monocytes, macrophages and dendritic cells ===
Monocytes/macrophages can undergo epigenetic modifications after a ligation of their pattern recognition receptors (PRRs). This ligation prepares these cells for a second encounter with the training pathogen. The secondary response may be heightened not only against the training pathogen, but also against different pathogens whose antigens are recognized by the same PRRs. This effect has been observed when stimulating cells by β-glucan, Candida albicans, or by vaccination against tuberculosis with a vaccine containing BCG. Monocytes are very short-lived cells; however, the heightened secondary response can be spotted even several months after the primary stimulation. This shows that the immune memory is created at the level of progenitor cells, but so far it is not known how this memory is achieved. Though the epigenetic modification is beneficial to the innate immune system response, it can impair macrophage resolution pathways- promoting unfavorable tissue remodeling at the inflammatory site. Additionally, dendritic cells isolated from mice exposed to Cryptococcus neoformans, manifested an immunological memory response, associated with a strong interferon-γ production after C. neoformans reinfection.

Trained immunity can shift macrophages toward a pro-inflammatory glycolytic M1 phenotype by an Akt/mTor HIF1α dependent pathway, away from the M2 phenotype in which macrophages maintain the Krebs cycle and oxidative phosphorylation

=== NK cells and innate lymphoid cell ===
The trained immunity involving NK cells looks more like classic immunological memory, because there is development of at least partially-specific clones of NK cells. These cells have receptors on their surface against the antigens with which they came in contact during the first stimulation. For example, after the encounter with cytomegalovirus, certain clones of NK cells (those that have a Ly49H receptor on their surface) expand and then show signs of immunological memory. Reinfection of memory NK cells in mouse led to an enhanced cytokine production by Ly49H receptor with a more specific response to pathogen. In human NK cells, this is mediated by NKG2C a receptor with a similar function as mouse Ly49H. NK cells are known for their memory specific to different pathogens. The first descriptions of NK memory-like phenotype were made on mouse models with murine cytomegalovirus infections. Other viral infections such as Herpes Simplex Virus or Influenza Virus also induce memory or memory-like responses. Memory or memory-like phenotype can be caused by bacterial pathogens, for example Mycobacterium tuberculosis, or eukaryotic pathogens, for example Toxoplasma gondii.

Another resident cell group 1 innate lymphoid cells (ILC1s) were discovered in liver, which expand after the infection with murine cytomegalovirus and which have manifest transcriptional, phenotypical and epigenetic changes. For the induction of ILC1s, pro-inflammatory cytokine and antigen specificity are critical. Lung specific ILC2 showed memory-like phenotype after allergen exposure

== Epigenetic reprogramming ==
Trained immunity relies on epigenetic reprogramming which leads to a stronger and rapid response to recurrent triggers. There are multiple potential epigenetic mechanisms such as changes in chromatin accessibility, DNA methylation or histone modifications. Long non-coding RNAs (lncRNAs) are also critical to epigenetic reprogramming, such as their role in the assignment of H3K4me3 markers to genome which modulates gene expression. Additionally, transcription factors, including STAT4 and RUNX family transcription factors play a role in the introduction of histone modifications. Cell metabolism is a crucial mediator of trained immunity, for example monocytes trained with β-glucan had an increased aerobic glycolysis. Additionally, priming with β-glucan resulted in epigenetic upregulation of genes involved in glycolysis 1 week later. Subsequently, a cross-talk between glycolysis, glutaminolysis and cholesterol synthesis pathways was demonstrated as essential for trained immunity – β-glucan-triggered monocytes. In addition, accumulation of fumarate, caused by glutamine addition into tricarboxylic acid cycle, led to epigenetic reprogramming similar to β-glucan treatment
