= Sankenbach Waterfalls =

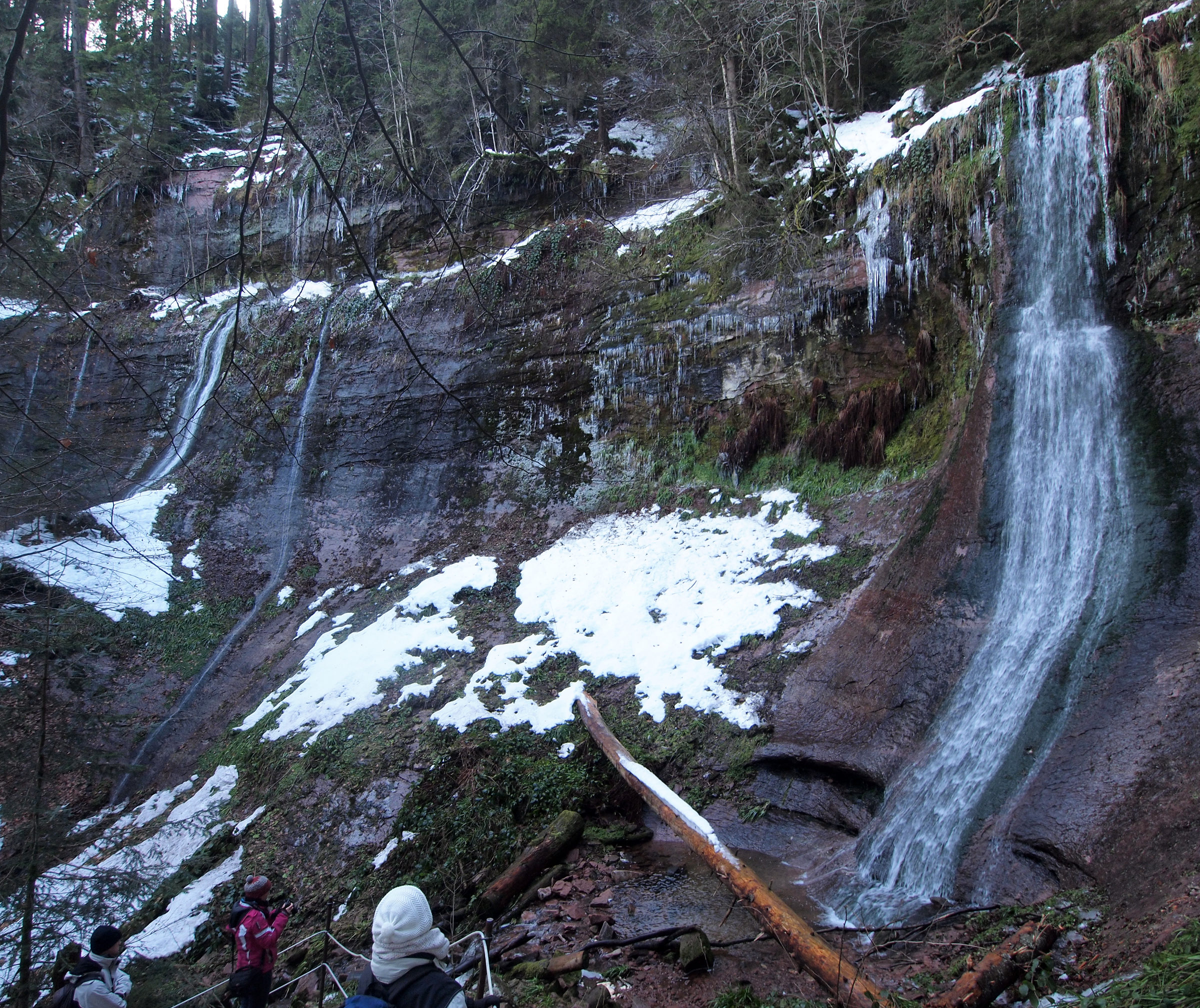
- Sankenbach Falls
- Interactive map of Sankenbach Waterfalls
- Location: Baiersbronn, Freudenstadt, Northern Black Forest, Baden-Württemberg, Germany
- Coordinates: 48°29′07″N 8°20′00″E
- Elevation: 750 m
- Number of drops: 4
- Total width: 2
- Watercourse: Sankenbach / Sankenbach → Forbach → Murg
- Average flow rate: 0.003

The Sankenbach Waterfalls (German: Sankenbach-Wasserfälle) are a cascade southwest of the village of Baiersbronn in the Black Forest in Germany. The Sankenbach flows over the waterfalls, dropping a total of 40 metres. The falls drop down the headwall of the cirque of the Sankenbach Bowl (Sankenbachkessel) in the Eckscher Horizon (Eck’scher Horizont) of the Lower Bunter Sandstone. Shortly afterwards the Sankenbach feeds the Sankenbachsee.

The volume of the waterfall can be regulated by visitors by impounding the inflowing water in a small retaining basin above the upper waterfall using a slider. The volume of the cascading water increases for a while after the slider is lifted. It is operated from a footbridge which crosses the little reservoir by means of a long wooden lever.

Retention system

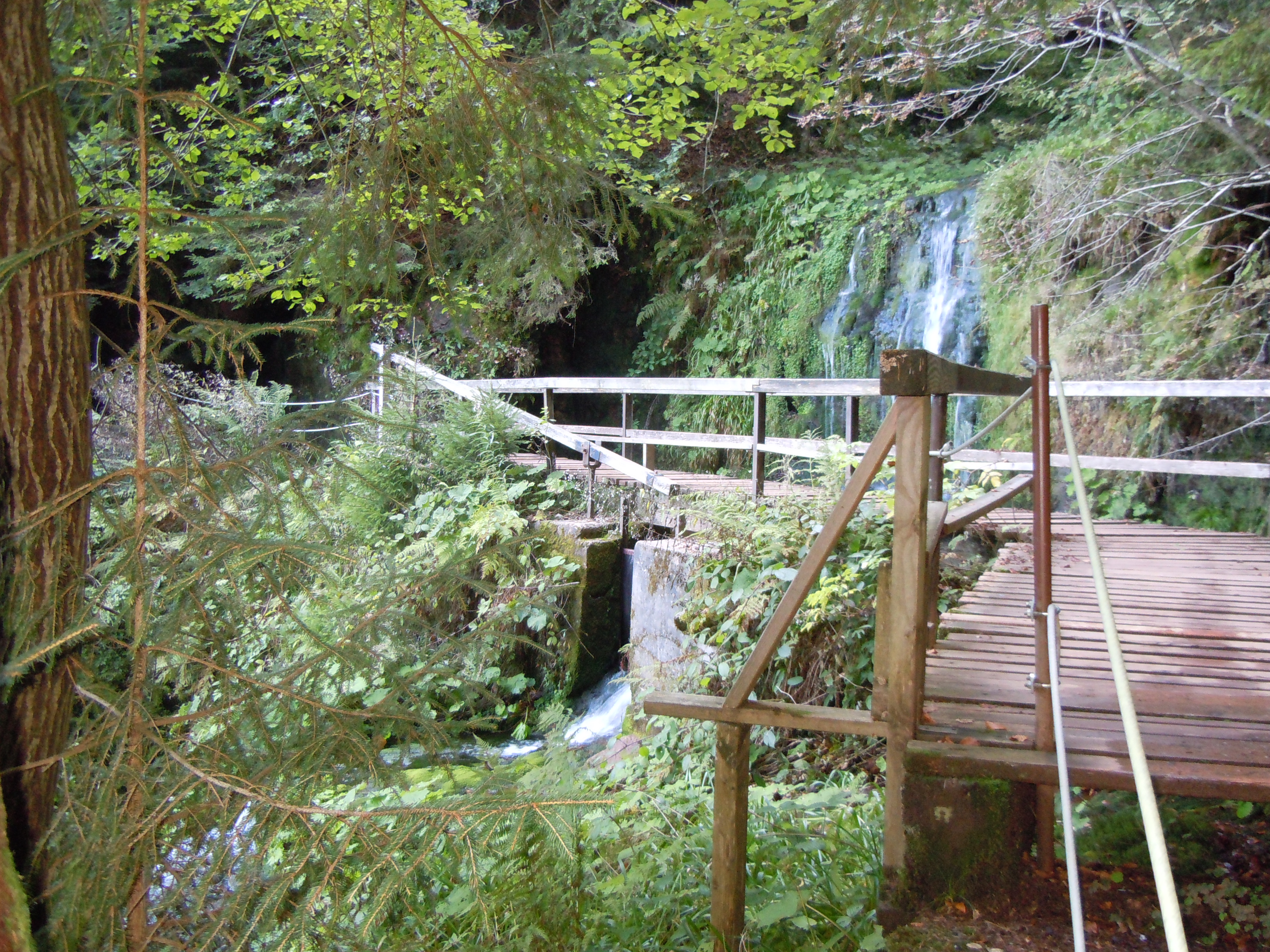
Footbridge and lever for operating the retention system

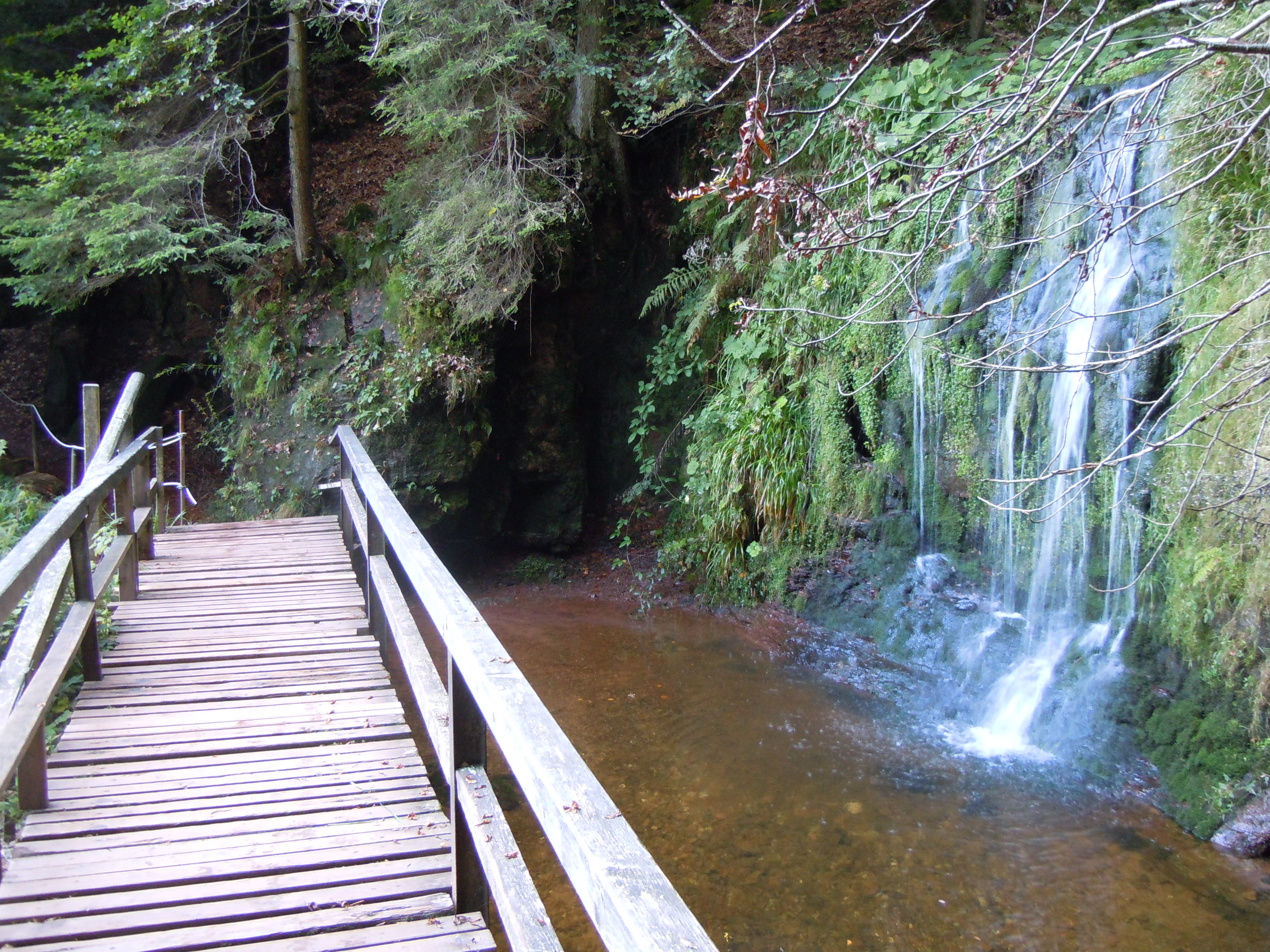
Upper fall and water reservoir

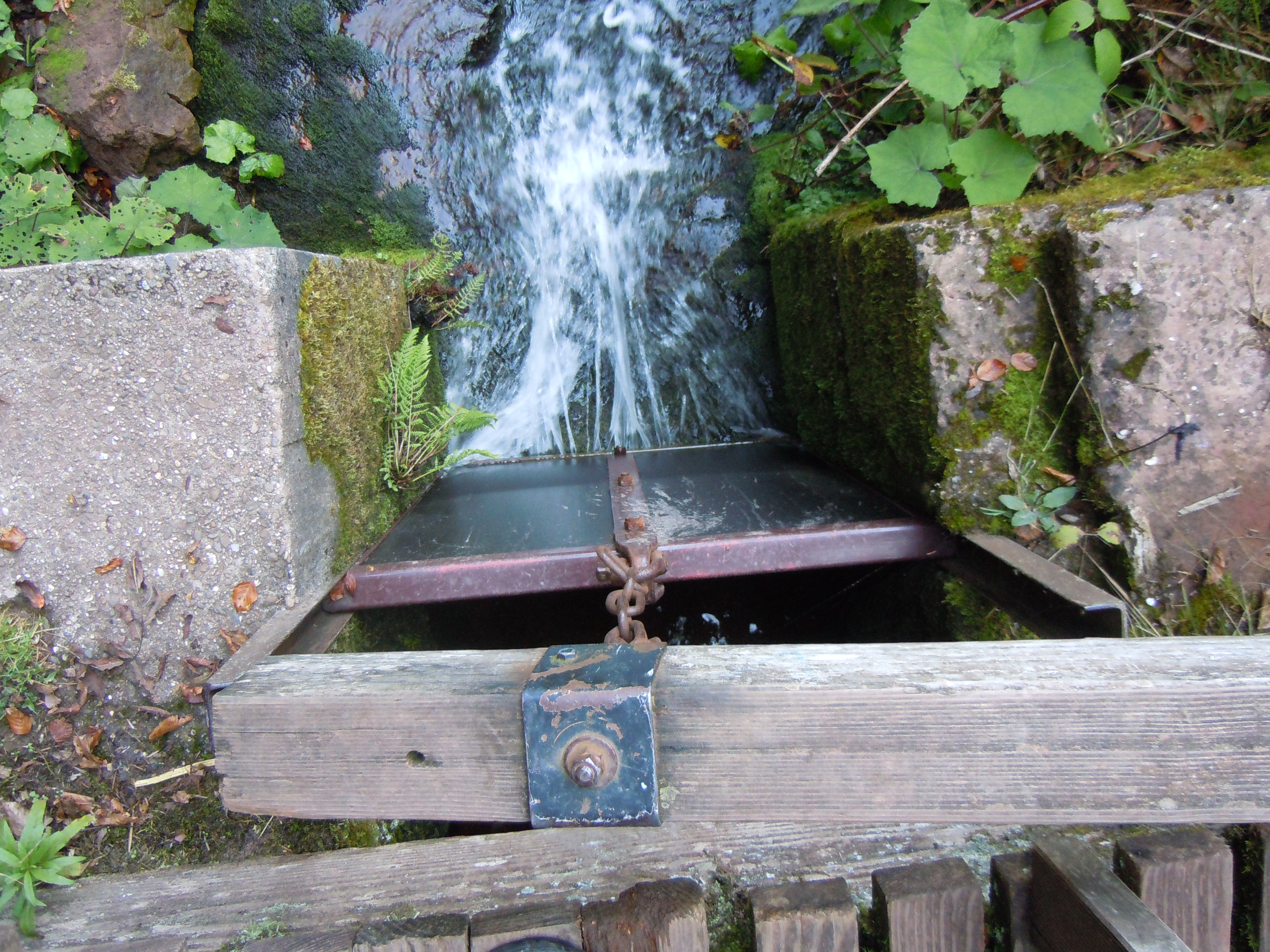
View from above of the closed slider

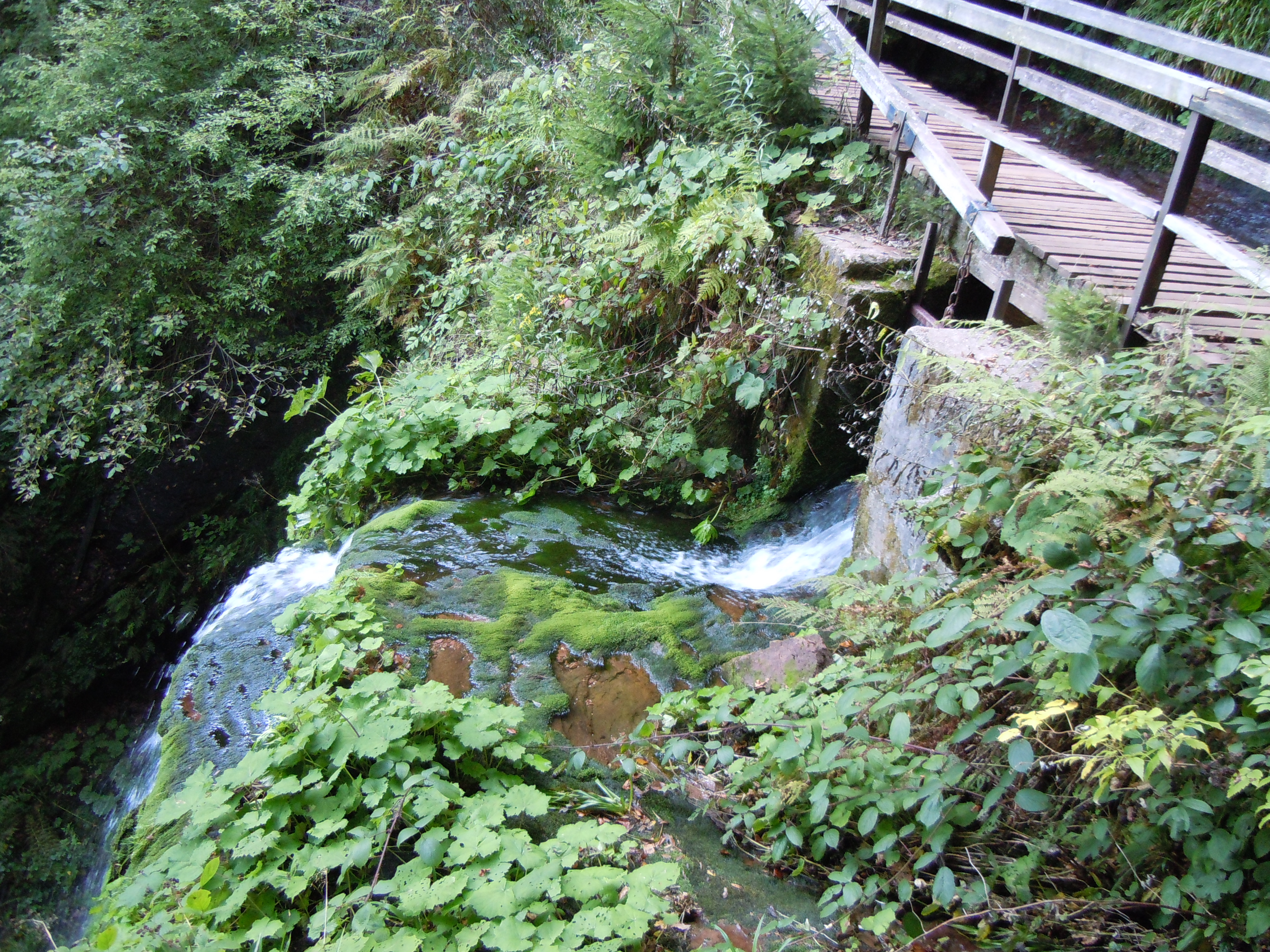
Dam facility and edge of the lower main waterfall

== See also ==
- List of waterfalls
