= Johan Sebastiaan Ploem =

Dutch microscopist and artist

- Born: 25 August 1927 (age 99); Sumatra, Indonesia
- Known for: Inventor of reflection contrast microscopy, inventor of epi-illumination cube for fluorescence microscopy
- Scientific career
- Fields: Advanced microscopy; molecular diagnostics; Digital painting
- Workplaces: University of Miami; University of Amsterdam; University of Leiden
- Thesis: Enkele methoden voor toxiciteitsonderzoek met behulp van weefselkweekcellen (1967)
- Doctoral advisor: Jos van der Meer
- Website: ploem-reflection-contrast-microscopy.com

Johan Sebastiaan Ploem HonFRMS (born 25 August 1927) is a Dutch microscopist and digital artist. He made significant contribution to the field of fluorescence microscopy, and invented reflection interference contrast microscopy.

== Early life and education ==
Ploem was born on 25 August 1927 in Sawahlunto in West Sumatra, then part of the Dutch East Indies. At 2 years old his family moved to the Netherlands, where he remained the rest of his youth.

Ploem received an MD at University of Utrecht in 1962. He also worked as an intern in the Broussais Hospital in Paris with Louis Pasteur Vallery-Radot. In 1963, Ploem was elected a Fulbright Fellow for study at the Harvard University School of Public Health, where he received a MPH Cum Laude in 1964. He obtained a Ph.D. degree in 1967 from the University of Amsterdam, titled Enkele methoden voor toxiciteitsonderzoek met behulp van weefselkweekcellen.

== Scientific career ==
Ploem has been employed by a number of academic institutions, including the University of Miami, Harvard University, the University of Amsterdam and the University of Leiden. At Leiden he served as a professor at the Faculty of Medicine in the Department of Cytochemistry and Cytometry from 1980 to 1992, after which he became a Professor Emeritus there. Ploem has also served as visiting lecturer or professor at various universities, including University of Dundee, University of Florida, Monash University, University of Beijing and Free University of Brussels.

=== Fluorescence microscopy ===
Ploem is most well known for inventing the epi-illumination cube used in fluorescence microscopy.

Around 1962 Ploem started work in collaboration with Schott on the development of dichroic beam splitters for reflection of blue and green light for fluorescence microscopy using epi illumination. At the time of his first publication on fluorescence microscopy using epi illumination with narrow-band blue and green light, he was not aware of the development of a dichroic beam splitter for UV excitation with incident light by Brumberg and Krylova.

Ploem's prototype fluorescence epi-illuminators and microscopes form a part of the permanent exposition of the Dutch National Museum for the history of Science and Medicine.

=== Reflection contrast microscopy ===
In 1973, at the Second Conference on Mononuclear Phagocytes held in Leiden, Ploem introduced an improvement to Interference Reflection Microscopy (IRM), which he called Reflection Contrast Microscopy (RCM). He also wrote a book chapter in the associated conference proceeding edited by Ralph van Furth. The improvement is the addition of crossed polarizers and a so-called "anti-flex objective", the combination of which further reduces stray light in an IRM microscope, allowing even better interference contrast. RCM is more commonly known as Reflection Contrast Interference Microscopy (RICM) today.

== Honors and awards ==
Various awards and honors have been bestowed on Ploem:

- Fellow of the Papanicolaou Cancer Research Institute, Miami, Florida, 1977
- Fellowship to the Institute for Cell Analysis at the University of Miami, Florida, 1979
- C. E. Alken Foundation award, co-recipient, Switzerland, 1982
- Ernst Abbe Medal and Award of the New York Microscopical Society, 1998
- Erica Wachtel medal from the British Society for Clinical Cytology, 1993 (held the Erica Wachtel Medal Lecture)
- The first Honorary member of the International Society for Analytical Cytology, 1993
- Honorary fellow of the Royal Microscopical Society (FRMS), 1976, Oxford
- Honorary fellow of the New York Microscopical Society
- Honorary fellow of the Polish Society of Surgery
- Honorary fellow of the German Society of Surgery
- In 1994, the European Society for Analytical Cellular Pathology established a Conference Keynote "Ploem" Lecture for invited scientists at its future general meetings
- The International Society of Analytical Cytology invited Professor Ploem to present its inaugural "Robert Hooke" lecture.
- In 1995, he was invited by the Royal Microscopical Society to give the inaugural CYTO lecture.

== Digital painting ==
Ploem started painting as a small boy and was educated in drawing and painting in Maastricht, the Netherlands. While still at secondary school he attended an evening course in drawing and painting at the Kunstnijverheidsschool Maastricht. Ploem's presence in Paris was important for his knowledge and interest in art since he could regularly visit his cousins in Paris, the painter Frits Klein and his son Yves Klein. He visited the Kleins when Yves was making his first monochromes.

In the last years of his activities at the faculty of medicine at Leiden University, he concentrated on research in image analysis. He was asked to participate in a European project with the aim of automating cancer cell recognition using computer analysis. It concerned a collaborative project with the German optical company Leitz/Leica Microsystems, and the Institute for Mathematical Morphology in Fontainebleau, France. Together with a team, Professor Jean Serra at this institute had developed an image analysis method, now internationally known as mathematical morphology. With his experience as an analogue painter, Ploem saw the possibility of also applying the methods of mathematical morphology to the creation of digital art.

At the International Symposium on Mathematical Morphology in Amsterdam (1998), Ploem presented a paper on the creation of computer graphics with Mathematical Morphology, using for the first time, the transforming algorithms from the Fontainebleau group for the creation of digital art. He wrote about it in the chapter of a book (ISBN 978-0-7923-5133-7) published on that occasion.

His first digital graphics of nature scenes were shown in his exposition at a regional art centre in the Pyrenees (Ossega, June 1997).

He was invited for a symposium on Art et Science at the University of Caen, France (April 2001). At the art exposition connected with this symposium, he presented 6 digital graphics that were dominated by chaotic transformations of rock art themes. A similar invitation was made by the University of Basel in Switzerland (April 2002).

Meadow near Sauto, Pyrenees, France

In the valley of the Eyne, Pyrenees

David and Goliath (multiple image transformations of a romanesque painting in the Sant Climent church in Taull)
