= Phosphomevalonic acid =

Names
- IUPAC name 3-hydroxy-3-methyl- 5-phosphonooxy-pentanoic acid

Identifiers
CAS Number	1189-94-2
3D model (JSmol)	Interactive image
ChemSpider	463
MeSH	Phosphomevalonic+acid
PubChem CID	476
CompTox Dashboard (EPA)	DTXSID00868263
- InChI: InChI=1S/C6H13O7P/c1-6(9,4-5(7)8)2-3-13-14(10,11)12/h9H,2-4H2,1H3,(H,7,8)(H2,10,11,12) Key: OKZYCXHTTZZYSK-UHFFFAOYSA-N
- SMILES: CC(CCOP(=O)(O)O)(CC(=O)O)O

Properties
Chemical formula	C_{6}H_{13}O_{7}P
Molar mass	228.137 g/mol
- Except where otherwise noted, data are given for materials in their standard state (at 25 °C [77 °F], 100 kPa). verify (what is ?) Infobox references

Phosphomevalonic acid is an intermediate in the Mevalonate pathway.

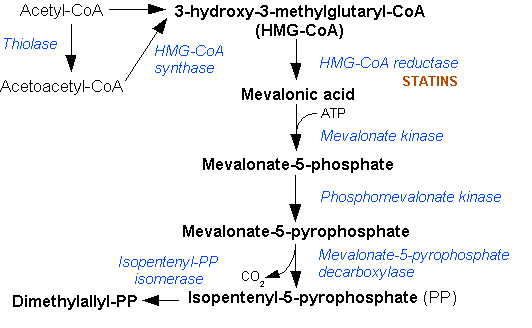
Mevalonate pathway. (Phosphomevalonic acid labeled as "mevalonate-5-phosphate"
