= Baiersbronn =

- Municipality
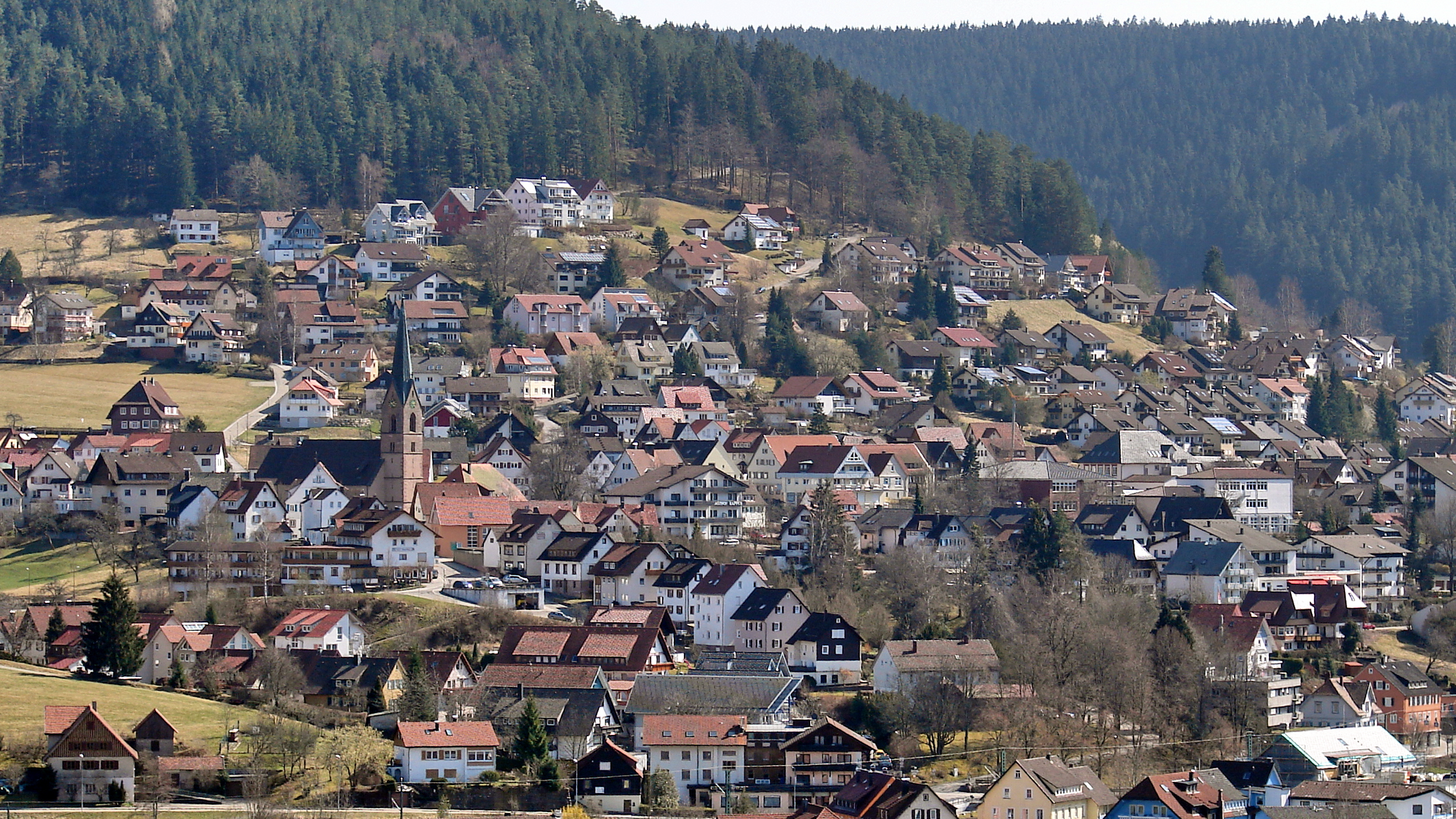
- Baiersbronn

- Coat of arms

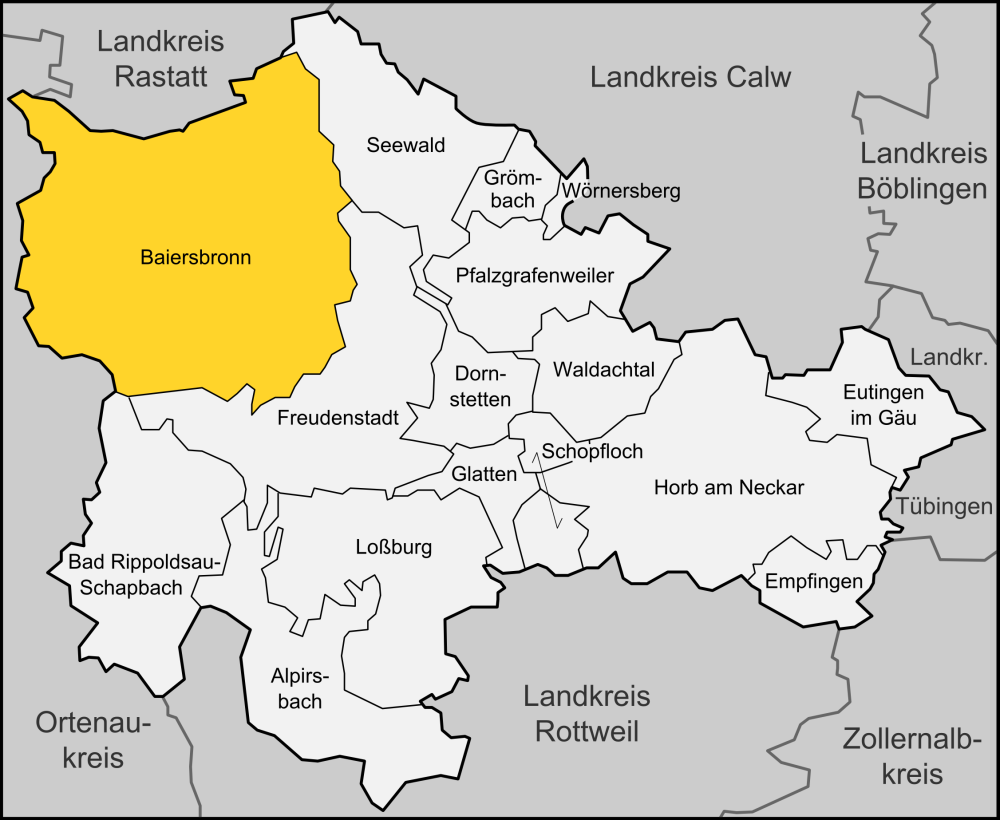
- Location of Baiersbronn within Freudenstadt district
- Interactive map of Baiersbronn
- Location within Germany Location within Baden-Württemberg
- Coordinates: 48°30′21″N 8°22′16″E
- Country: Germany
- State: Baden-Württemberg
- Admin. region: Karlsruhe
- District: Freudenstadt

Government
  - Mayor (2019–27): Michael Ruf (Ind.)

Area
  - Total: 189.58 km^{2} (73.20 sq mi)
- Elevation: 584 m (1,916 ft)

Population (2025-12-31)
  - Total: 15,256
  - Density: 80.473/km^{2} (208.42/sq mi)
- Time zone: UTC+01:00 (CET)
  - Summer (DST): UTC+02:00 (CEST)
- Postal codes: 72270
- Dialling codes: 07442, 07447, 07449
- Vehicle registration: FDS, HCH, HOR, WOL
- Website: https://www.gemeinde-baiersbronn.de/

Baiersbronn (German pronunciation: [ˈbaɪɐsˌbʁɔn]) is a municipality and a village in the district of Freudenstadt in Baden-Württemberg in southern Germany. It is situated in the Black Forest on the Murg river. Nearby is the mountain of Rinkenkopf (759.6 m) with its hillfort, the Rinkenwall.

Administratively, Baiersbronn consists of the following nine villages:

- Baiersbronn
- Friedrichstal
- Huzenbach
- Klosterreichenbach
- Mitteltal
- Obertal
- Röt-Schönegründ
- Schönmünzach-Schwarzenberg
- Tonbach

In its current form, Baiersbronn was created in the 1960s and 1970s by joining five municipalities. Its main industry is tourism.

Baiersbronn is twinned with Midhurst in West Sussex, England. Reichenbach Priory, a medieval monastery building, is located in the village of Klosterreichenbach.

Baiersbronn is famous as a centre of haute cuisine in Germany, having 8 Michelin stars in total. According to the New York Times of April 2013, Baiersbronn has the same number of Michelin three-star restaurants as London and twice as many as Chicago. According to The New York Times, "Baiersbronn is now on its way to becoming recognized as the world’s most unexpected restaurant capital."

== Born in Baiersbronn ==
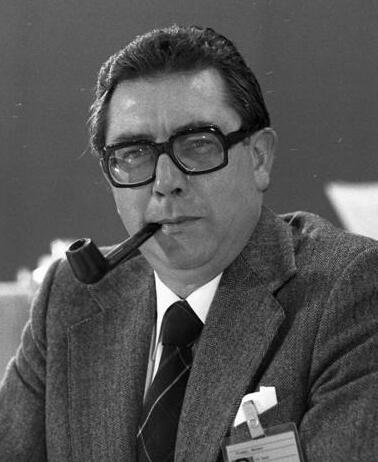
Werner Klumpp

- Ferdinand Oechsle (1774–1852), developer of a most scale, Mostwaage ("Oechsle degree")
- Emil Georg von Stauß (1877-1942), German banker
- Werner Klumpp (born 1928), politician (FDP), Saarland Minister for Economic Affairs, President of the Savings Banks Association Saar
- Stefan Wisniewski (born 1953), ex-terrorist and former member of the Red Army Faction
- Jens Gaiser (born 1978), Nordic combiner
- Melanie Faisst (born 1990), ski jumper
- Manuel Faisst (born 1993), Nordic combiner
- David Siegel (born 1996), ski jumper

== See also ==
Lakes within the municipality

- Buhlbachsee
- Sankenbachsee

Waterfalls

- Sankenbach Waterfalls
