= Immunometabolism =

Branch of biology

Immunometabolism is a branch of biology that studies the interplay between metabolism and immunology in all organisms. In particular, immunometabolism is the study of the molecular and biochemical underpinnings for i) the metabolic regulation of immune function, and ii) the regulation of metabolism by molecules and cells of the immune system. Further categorization includes i) systemic immunometabolism and ii) cellular immunometabolism. Immunometabolism includes metabolic inflammation: a chronic, systemic, low grade inflammation, orchestrated by metabolic deregulation caused by obesity or aging.

Immunometabolism first appears in academic literature in 2011, where it is defined as "an emerging field of investigation at the interface between the historically distinct disciplines of immunology and metabolism." A later article defines immunometabolism as describing "the changes that occur in intracellular metabolic pathways in immune cells during activation". Broadly, immunometabolic research records the physiological functioning of the immune system in the context of different metabolic conditions in health and disease. These studies can cover molecular and cellular aspects of immune system function in vitro, in situ, and in vivo, under different metabolic conditions. For example, highly proliferative cells such as cancer cells and activating T cells undergo metabolic reprogramming, increasing glucose uptake to shift towards aerobic glycolysis during normoxia. While aerobic glycolysis is an inefficient pathway for ATP production in quiescent cells, this so-called “Warburg effect” supports the bioenergetic and biosynthetic needs of rapidly proliferating cells.

== Signalling and metabolic network ==
There are many indispensable signalling molecules connected to metabolic processes, which play an important role in both the immune system homeostasis and in the immune response. From these the most significant are mammalian target of rapamycin (mTOR), liver kinase B1 (LKB1), 5' AMP-activated protein kinase (AMPK), phosphoinositide 3 kinase (PI3K) and protein kinase B (akt). All of the aforementioned molecules together control the most important metabolic pathways in cells like glycolysis, krebs cycle or oxidative phosphorylation. To fully understand how all of these molecules and pathways affect the immune cells, it is first needed to examine the delicate interplay of these molecules.

=== mTOR ===
mTOR is a serine/threonine protein kinase, which is found in 2 complexes in cells: mTOR complex 1 and 2 (mTORC1 and mTORC2). mTORC1 is activated through the T cell receptor (TCR) and the costimulatory molecule cluster of differentiation 28 (CD28) engagement. However, it can also be activated by growth factors like IL-7 or IL-2 and by metabolites like glucose or amino acids (leucin, arginine or glutamine). In contrast, there are more gaps as to how mTORC2 pathway functions, but its activation is also achieved through growth factors as exemplified by IL-2.

When activated mTORC1 negatively regulates autophagy (through inhibiting the ULK complex) and shifts the cell towards aerobic glycolysis, glutaminolysis (through activation of c-Myc) and promotes lipid synthesis and mitochondrial remodelling. mTORC2 enhances glycolysis as well, but in contrast to mTORC1, it activates akt, which in turn promotes glucose transporter 1 (GLUT1) membrane deposition. It also further promotes, through other kinases, cell proliferation and survival.

=== PI3K-akt ===
PI3K mediates the phosphorylation of phosphatidylinositol-(4,5)-bisphosphate (PIP2) into phosphatidylinositol-(3,4,5)-trisphosphate (PIP3). PIP3 then serves as a scaffold for other proteins, which contain a pleckstrin homology (PH) domain. It can be activated, just like mTOR, through TCR, CD28 and, unlike mTOR, through another costimulatory molecule: Inducible T-cell COStimulator (ICOS).

The present of PIP3 on a membrane recruits many proteins including phosphoinositide-dependent protein kinase 1 (PDK1), which after its phosphorylation together with mTORC2 activates akt, a serine/threonine kinase. As a result akt promotes GLUT1 membrane deposition and akt also inhibits transcription factor forkhead box O (FoxO), whose inactivation acts in synergy with the mTORC2 above mentioned changes.

=== LKB1-AMPK ===
Both LKB1 and AMPK are serine/threonine kinases acting predominantly opposingly to the aforementioned molecules. From the two, LKB1's activation is less understood, as it is mainly dependants on cellular localization and on many posttranslational modifications. For instance the above-mentioned akt can stimulate LKB1 inhibition through promoting nuclear retention. When activated, LKB1 can activate, apart from other targets, AMPK, whose activation leads to mTORC1 destabilization. Furthermore, it activates ULK complex, phosphorylates p53 and acetyl-CoA carboxylase (ACC), which promotes autophagy, cell cycle arrest and fatty acids oxidation respectively. Since AMPK can also be activated through adenosine monophosphate (AMP) or by glucose insufficiency, it acts as a sensor of starvation and therefore activates many already mentioned catabolic processes, which is in direct contrast with mTOR, which activates myriad of anabolic processes.

== Measurement approaches ==
Measurement of immunometabolism spans from bulk assays like extracellular flux analysis to cutting-edge single-cell metabolomics using mass spectrometry and isotope tracing. By combining machine learning with live single-cell metabolomics, one can identify distinct metabolic signatures of immune cell subtypes such as macrophage polarization. Single-cell analytical approaches can uncover metabolic heterogeneity underlying immune cell activation and plasticity.

== Immune cells ==
Generally speaking, cells, whose primary objective is their long-term survival or control of inflammation, in terms of energy tend to rely on Krebs cycle and lipid oxidation which are both coupled with functional oxidative phosphorylation. Among these cells we can include naive T cells, memory T cells, regulatory T cells (Tregs), unstimulated innate immune cells like macrophages and M2 macrophages. On the contrary, cells whose main function is proliferation, synthesis of different molecules or propagation of inflammation often prefer glycolysis as a source of energy and metabolites. Therefore, into these cells belong for instance effector T cells and M1 macrophages.

=== T cells ===
Naive T cells have to be kept in a permanent state of quiescence, until they encounter their cognate antigen. The quiescence state is sustained by tonic TCR signalling and by IL-7. Tonic TCR signalling is necessary to keep the FoxO transcription factor active, which in turn allows for IL-7R transcription. This enables the T cell to survive and proliferate at a low rate. However, during this tonic TCR signalling proteins, that control metabolism, have to be strictly regulated, because their activation could lead to spontaneous exit of quiescence and differentiation into various T cells subset, as exemplified by the uncontrolled activation of PI3K which causes the development of Th1 or Th2.

Both of the aforementioned signals should lead to the mTOR and akt activation, but in quiescence T cells there are tuberous sclerosis complex (TSC) and phosphatase and tensin homolog (PTEN) acting against their activations. Therefore, a naive T cell dependent predominantly on oxidative phosphorylation and has much lower glucose uptake and ATP production than their activated counterparts (effector T cells).

Quiescence exit begins when a T cell encounters its cognate antigen usually during an infection. The TCR signal together with the costimulation signal lead to downregulation of PTEN and TSC. This causes the phosphorylation cascades of mTOR and akt and many more kinases to be fully activated. These cascades activities result in glucose and glutamine uptake coupled with higher glycolysis and glutaminolysis, which not only supports rapid cell growth, but also further promotes mTOR activation. Furthermore, mTOR stimulates lipid synthesis and mitochondria remodelling, exemplified by increased expression of sterol regulatory element-binding protein (SREBP) and mitochondria undergoing fission, which causes them to function predominantly as biosynthetic hubs, rather than energy production hubs. After their activation and the metabolic reprogramming, T cells compete with one another and consequently, it is very likely that during its effector phase T cells reach a point, where they suffer from lack of nutrients. In such cases AMPK is activated to balance the mTOR signalling and to prevent apoptosis.

The described scheme of quiescence exit holds true for inflammatory T cells subsets like Th1, Th2, Th17 and cytotoxic T cells. However, mTOR activity can be detrimental when we focus on Tregs. This is shown by the fact that in Tregs high activation of mTORC1 coupled with a higher level of glycolysis leads to the failure of Treg lineage commitment. Therefore, in contrast to inflammatory cell subsets, Tregs rely on oxidative phosphorylation fuelled by lipid oxidation. Complete suppression of glycolysis leads to enolase (a glycolytic enzyme) binding to a splice variant of Foxp3, which effectively compromises peripheral Tregs abilities to act as immunosuppressive cells.

After the infection is cleared most of the activated T cells succumb to apoptosis. However, few of them survive and develop into the memory T cell subsets. For this development the engagement of costimulatory molecules, like CD28, appears to be crucial, as the co-stimulation manifests in mitochondrial morphology, thus allowing for higher oxidative phosphorylation but also retaining the potential to quickly revert to glycolysis. Moreover, T cell activation causes an overall increase in acetyl-CoA, which is a substrate for the histone acetylation. As a results, many genes are acetylated and therefore accessible to transcription even after the differentiation into memory subsets, hence allowing memory T cells to rapidly re-express some effector related genes. The aforementioned changes allow T cells to become memory cells, but what exactly drives the memory cell differentiation is still under debate, even though IL-15 seems to be necessary for the T cell memory induction. Recently, asymmetric division of mTORC1, during the first divisions after TCR activation, has been shown to drive the memory cell differentiation in those cells which receive lower amount of mTORC1.

=== Macrophages ===
Immunometabolism of macrophages is mostly studied in the two opposing populations of macrophages: M1 and M2. M1 macrophages are a pro-inflammatory population induced by LPS or IFNγ. This activation leads, as in the case of T cells, to increase in glycose uptake and glycolysis. What is strikingly different is the Krebs cycle, as in the case of M1 macrophages the cycle is broken at two places. The first break is the conversion of iso-citrate to α-ketoglutarate owing to the downregulation of isocitrate dehydrogenase. Accumulated citrate is subsequently used for lipid and itaconate synthesis, which are both indispensable for M1 macrophages function. The second break at the succinate to fumarate transition occurs probably due to the itaconate production and causes a build up of succinate. This triggers ROS production, which stabilizes HIF-1α. This transcription factor further promotes glycolysis and it is essential for activation of inflammatory macrophages.

M2 macrophages are anti-inflammatory cells which need for their induction IL-4. M2 macrophages metabolism is markedly distinct from M1 macrophages due to their unbroken Krebs cycle, which after their activation is fuelled by upragulated glycolysis, glutaminolysis and fatty acid oxidation. How the fully operational Krebs cycle exactly translates to M2 macrophages functions is still poorly understood, but the upregulated pathways allow for production of intermediates (mainly acetyl-CoA and S-adenosyl methionine), which are needed for histone modifications of genes targeted by IL-4 signalling.

== Drug discovery ==
Immunometabolism is an area of growing drug discovery research investment in numerous areas of medicine, such as for example, in lessening the impact of age-related metabolic dysfunction and obesity on incidence of type 2 diabetes/ cardiovascular disease, cancer, as well as infectious diseases. In recent years, evidence suggests that immunometabolism is implicated in autoimmune disorders. The metabolic alterations on immune system regulation have provided unique insights into disease pathogenesis and development, as well as potential therapeutic targets.

== Immunometabolism - from inflammation to sepsis ==
Sepsis-Related Immunometabolic Paralysis

Sepsis pathophysiology now includes immunometabolic paralysis, a condition marked by severe abnormalities in cellular energy metabolism. This phenomenon affects both the acute and late stages of the disease, playing a critical role in the immune response during sepsis.

Summary

A potentially fatal illness known as sepsis is brought on by the body's overreaction to an infection. Although there is a strong inflammatory response during the early phase of sepsis, immunometabolic paralysis may appear later on and is linked to a bad prognosis for the patient. Shih Chin Cheng and colleagues have conducted recent research that explores the complex interplay between cellular metabolism and the immune response in sepsis.

Important Results

• 1. Transition from Oxidative Phosphorylation to Aerobic Glycolysis: The Warburg effect, which occurs during the acute stage of sepsis, is characterized by a change from oxidative phosphorylation to aerobic glycolysis. One of the key mechanisms in the first activation of the host defense against infections is this metabolic change.

• 2. Impaired Energy Metabolism in Leukocytes: It was shown that patients experiencing acute sepsis exhibited extensive impairments in cellular energy metabolism, which impacted leukocyte glycolysis and oxidative metabolism. The ailment known as immunometabolic paralysis is associated with a compromised capacity to react to secondary stimulus.

• 3. IFN-γ's Function in Restoring Glycolysis: Interferon-gamma, or IFN-γ, is being explored as a possible treatment option IFN-γ therapy partially restored glycolysis, in tolerant monocytes, as demonstrated by in vitro tests, demonstrating its ability to mitigate the metabolic abnormalities linked to immunotolerance.

Therapeutic Implications

The work emphasizes how cellular metabolism in sepsis might be targeted therapeutically. Although few medicines possessing metabolic-regulatory properties have been investigated, the study emphasizes how important it is to comprehend and treat immunometabolic paralysis in order to improve outcomes for individuals suffering from sepsis.

Conclusion

To sum up, the research conducted by Cheng and colleagues provides significant understanding of the intricate relationship between immune response and cellular metabolism in sepsis. A crucial role for immunometabolic paralysis—a condition marked by impaired energy metabolism—in the development and cure of sepsis is revealed. It appears that more investigation and testing of therapeutic approaches aimed at cellular metabolism will help to improve the management of sepsis.
