= Acquired idiopathic generalized anhidrosis =

- Other names: AIGA
- Specialty: Dermatology

Acquired idiopathic generalized anhidrosis (AIGA) is characterized by generalized absence of sweating without other autonomic and neurologic dysfunction. Other symptoms include facial flushing, headaches, disorientation, lassitude, hyperthermia, weakness, and palpitations.

The diagnosis of acquired idiopathic generalized anhidrosis is made by ruling out other causes of anhidrosis and clinical criteria. Acquired idiopathic generalized anhidrosis is classified into 3 subgroups: idiopathic pure sudomotor failure (IPSF), sweat gland failure (SGF), and sudomotor neuropathy, with each subgroup presenting a different pathogenesis.

Treatment includes corticosteroid therapy. Acquired idiopathic generalized anhidrosis is considered to be rare but the exact prevalence is unknown. It is more common in males than females and usually manifests during the second and fourth decades of life.

== Signs and symptoms ==
When exposed to heat stimuli like high temperatures, high humidity, or physical activity, patients with AIGA are unable to sweat appropriately. Typically, anhidrosis and hypohidrosis are distributed symmetrically across the trunk. It is uncommon for the palms, soles, or axillae to be afflicted, although it can also affect the face and the extremities.

These patients are unable to sweat, which is crucial for controlling body temperature. As a result, heat builds up during physical activity or in hot conditions. Such individuals may exhibit a variety of symptoms, including facial flushing, headaches, disorientation, lassitude, hyperthermia, weakness, and palpitations. Certain patients may get heatstroke. In addition, cholinergic urticaria's prickling pain and rash are commonly seen. These symptoms frequently have a chronic course, while they occasionally resolve spontaneously.

== Causes ==
Acquired idiopathic generalized anhidrosis appears to have a variety of etiologies. Theoretically, dysfunction or degeneration of cholinergic sympathetic nerve fibers involved in sweating (sudomotor neuropathy), dysfunction of acetylcholine receptors and/or cholinergic signals (idiopathic pure sudomotor failure may fall under this category), and primary failures of the sweat glands with apparent morphological changes of the sweat apparatus can all be taken into consideration.

== Diagnosis ==
Congenital conditions such Fabry disease, hypohidrotic/anhidrotic ectodermal dysplasia, and congenital insensitivity to pain with anhidrosis should be ruled out in order to diagnose acquired idiopathic generalized anhidrosis is made. It's also necessary to rule out secondary sweating disorders linked to neurological conditions, metabolic illnesses, Sjögren's syndrome, and drug-induced sweating irregularities.

The diagnostic criteria for acquired idiopathic generalized anhidrosis is as follows:

1. Despite the widespread distribution of idiopathic anhidrosis or hypohidrosis lesions in a non-segmental spinal pattern, no additional neurological or autonomic symptoms are noted.
2. At least 25% of the body is affected by anhidrotic or hypohidrotic regions. These are characterized as regions that do not become black when subjected to the thermoregulatory sweat test (which is based on the Minor method utilizing the iodine-starch reaction) and other techniques, or regions that thermographically reveal hyperthermia.

When criteria 1 and 2 are met, the diagnosis of acquired idiopathic generalized anhidrosis is made.

Quantitative sudomotor axon reflex test and microneurography are used in the diagnosis of acquired idiopathic generalized anhidrosis. However, these refined methods are mostly used for research purposes and not generally available. Skin biopsy analysis may play a crucial role in the identification of acquired idiopathic generalized anhidrosis subgroups.

== Treatment ==
The early phases of acquired idiopathic generalized anhidrosis are indicated for corticosteroid therapy. Corticosteroids are said to have a negative effect on patients who have delayed starting treatment or who have sweat gland tissue deterioration. In addition, antihistamines, cyclosporine, and gabapentine have been used to treat acquired idiopathic generalized anhidrosis.

== Epidemiology ==
Since there are currently no published epidemiological data on acquired idiopathic generalized anhidrosis, its prevalence and morbidity are unclear. Given that as of 2016, there had only been about 100 cases reported, acquired idiopathic generalized anhidrosis is thought to be extremely uncommon.

Most known cases of acquired idiopathic generalized anhidrosis were documented in Japan. Therefore, it is uncertain if its prevalence changes according to area and race. With men making up over 80% of documented instances, acquired idiopathic generalized anhidrosis is noticeably more common in this population. acquired idiopathic generalized anhidrosis can strike at any age, from infancy to the eighth decade of life, even though the average onset age falls between the second and fourth decades of life.

== See also ==
- Hypohidrosis
- Hyperhidrosis
