= Sweat allergy =

Skin inflammation caused by sweat

- Specialty: Dermatology
- Causes: increases in the production of sweat.
- Treatment: Tannic acid, showering

A sweat allergy is the exacerbation of atopic dermatitis associated with an elevated body temperature and resulting increases in the production of sweat. It appears as small reddish welts that become visible in response to increased temperature and resulting production of sweat. It can affect all ages. Sweating can trigger intense itching or cholinergic urticaria. The protein MGL_1304 secreted by mycobiota (fungi) present on the skin such as Malassezia globosa acts as a histamine or antigen. People can be desensitized using their own samples of sweat that have been purified that contains small amounts of the allergen. The allergy is not due to the sweat itself but instead to an allergy-producing protein secreted by microorganisms found on the skin.

Cholinergic urticaria (CU) is one of the physical urticaria (hives) which is provoked during sweating events such as exercise, bathing, staying in a heated environment, or emotional stress. The hives produced are typically smaller than classic hives and are generally shorter-lasting.

Multiple subtypes have been elucidated, each of which require distinct treatment.

Tannic acid has been found to suppress the allergic response, along with showering.

== See also ==
- Miliaria
- Exercise-induced anaphylaxis
- Idiopathic pure sudomotor failure
- Hypohidrosis
- Fabry disease
- Allergy
- Food allergy
- List of allergens
- Tree nut allergy
- Cholinergic urticaria
