= ROSAH syndrome =

- ROSAH syndrome is inherited via an autosomal dominant manner.
- Causes: Mutation in ALPK1 gene

ROSAH syndrome is a genetic disease of innate immune activation. ROSAH stands for retinal dystrophy, optic nerve edema, splenomegaly, anhidrosis and headache. The name emphasizes some, but not all, of the features that can be associated with the syndrome. The disease is inherited in an autosomal dominant manner and caused by heterozygous missense mutations in the ALPK1 gene, an innate immune sensor for bacterial sugars.

== Signs and symptoms ==
While the initial descriptions of ROSAH syndrome emphasized the ocular manifestations of the disease, it is now clear that ROSAH syndrome can also present with a range of systemic features including recurrent fever, uveitis, deforming arthritis, AA amyloidosis, meningeal enhancement and premature mineralisation of the basal ganglia, substantia nigra and red nuclei on MRI. Additionally, clinical features not conventionally attributed to inflammation have also been reported and included short dental roots, enamel defects and decreased salivary flow.

== Pathophysiology ==
ALPK1 is a pattern recognition receptor of the innate immune system that recognises the bacterial metabolite ADP-heptose. ROSAH syndrome patients' primary samples and in vitro assays with mutated ALPK1 constructs have shown immune activation with increased NF-κB signaling, STAT1 phosphorylation and interferon gene expression signature.

== Genetics ==
This condition is caused by mutations in the ɑ-kinase gene (ALPK1) gene, most commonly changing the amino acid Threonine to Methionine at position 237 in the protein. This gene is located on the long arm of chromosome 4 (4q25). The inheritance of this condition is autosomal dominant.

== Diagnosis ==
Currently, screening for ROSAH syndrome is initiated upon a physician's judgement. Genetic testing for ROSAH syndrome can be performed as either targeted, single-gene testing through Sanger sequencing or a multi-gene test through whole exome sequencing or whole genome sequencing.

== Management ==
Some features of the disease are amenable to immunomodulatory therapy. However, additional studies will be need to determine if immunomodulation can mitigate the risk of progressive vision loss in this disease.

== Epidemiology ==
The prevalence is not known. To date, less than 70 individuals with ROSAH syndrome have been described in the medical literature. ROSAH syndrome was first coined in 2019, and since then almost 70 patients have been identified from 29 unrelated families.

== History ==
This condition was first described in 2012 prior to the discovery of the genetics and naming of the condition. The genetic basis of this condition was first published in an ARVO abstract in 2013 and in a complete article in 2019. In 2022, ROSAH Syndrome Foundation was established to serve patients with ROSAH syndrome by providing information and connecting them to other individuals living with ROSAH syndrome.
