= Pulling boat hands =

Pulling boat hands is a cutaneous condition that results from rowing in cold, wet conditions.

== See also ==
- Postmiliarial hypohidrosis
- List of cutaneous conditions
