= Cholinergic urticaria =

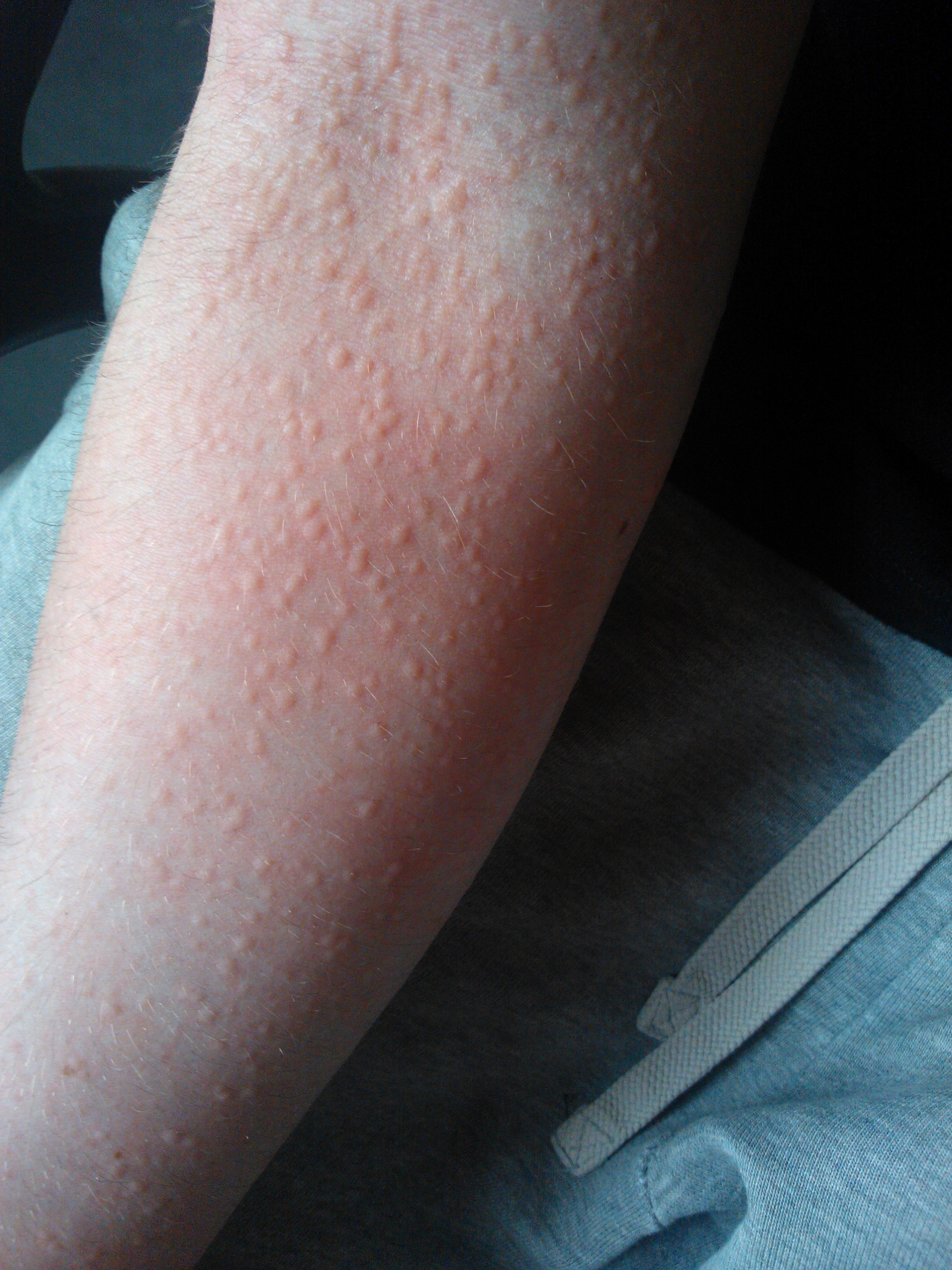
- CU on the volar aspect of the forearm
- Specialty: Dermatology
- Symptoms: Tiny "itchy" wheals and small papular bumps on a reddish background.
- Causes: Unclear (triggered by heat)
- Treatment: Medications, sweat therapy

Cholinergic urticaria (CholU, CU) is a chronic, inducible form of hives (urticaria) that is triggered by an elevation in body temperature, breaking a sweat, or exposure to heat. It is also sometimes called exercise-induced urticaria or heat hives. The condition is caused by an overreaction of the immune system to the release of histamine and other chemicals in response to the increase in body temperature. This results in the characteristic red, itchy, and sometimes raised bumps or welts on the skin that are associated with hives.

== Symptoms ==
Cholinergic urticaria typically presents with a number of small papular hives all over the body, that involve cutaneous inflammation (wheals) and severe nerve pain, which usually develops in response to exercise, bathing, staying in a heated environment, spicy foods, or emotional stress. Symptoms may also include respiratory symptoms, angioedema, or anaphylaxis. The symptoms subside and manifest rapidly on and off throughout the day with no notice, typically going away within an hour. Cholinergic urticaria may significantly impair quality of life, especially in relation to normal day-to-day activities. It is caused by an overreaction of the immune system to the release of histamine, mast cells, and other chemicals in response to the small nerve fibers throughout the body due to the increase in body temperature being allergic to sweat.

== Causes ==
- Dysautonomia
- Sweat hypersensitivity
- Acquired anhidrosis and/or hypohidrosis
- Idiopathic
- Opioid use
- Cholinesterase inhibitors
- Stress
- Spicy food
- Heat

== Subtypes ==
As of 2023, subtypes of the condition are still being determined. A 2023 review article in the American Journal of Clinical Dermatology lists four subtypes:

- Conventional sweat allergy-type cholinergic urticaria
- Follicular-type cholinergic urticaria with a positive autologous serum skin test (ASST) result
- Cholinergic urticaria with palpebral angioedema
- Cholinergic urticaria with acquired anhidrosis and/or hypohidrosis

=== Sweat hypersensitivity ===
This subtype of CU refers to those who are hypersensitive to their own sweat.

==== Diagnosis ====
Diagnosis is made by injecting autologous (the person's own) sweat into the skin.

==== Features ====
The hives are observed to coincide with perspiration points of sweating.

==== Pathophysiology ====
Tanaka et al. found that the sweat hyper-sensitivities of CU and atopic dermatitis seem to be virtually the same, and therefore, the sweat-induced histamine release from basophils may also be mediated by a specific IgE for sweat in atopic dermatitis as well as CU.

==== Treatment ====
- Sweat therapy: Forced perspiration by excessive body warming (sauna, hot bath, or exercise) used daily may reduce the symptoms through exhaustion of inflammatory mediators.
- Antihistamines: are a commonly prescribed first-line treatment for conventional urticaria, but its effectiveness in the treatment of CU is rather limited in most cases.
- Treatment(s) with mixed success: omalizumab (anti-IgE therapy), danazol (synthetic androgen), propranolol (beta blocker), zileuton (antileukotriene).
- (Other) proposed first-line treatment: Rapid desensitization protocol using autologous sweat.

=== Acquired anhidrosis and/or hypohidrosis ===
This subtype of CU refers to those who have abnormally reduced sweating. Forced perspiration by excessive body warming (hot bath or exercise) used daily may reduce the symptoms through exhaustion of inflammatory mediators.

==== Diagnosis ====
Sweat is readily visualized by a topical indicator such as iodinated starch or sodium alizarin sulphonate. Both undergo a dramatic colour change when moistened by sweat. A thermoregulatory sweat test evaluates the body's response to a thermal stimulus by inducing sweating through the use of a hot box or room, thermal blanket or exercise. Failure of the topical indicator to undergo a colour change during thermoregulatory sweat testing can indicate anhidrosis and/or hypohidrosis (see Minor test).

A skin biopsy may reveal cellular infiltrates in sweat glands or ducts.

==== Features ====
Severe heat intolerance (e.g., nausea, dizziness, and headache), and tingling, pricking, pinchy or burning pain over the entire body on exposure to hot environments or prolonged exercise which improve after cooling the body. Occurs in the absence of any causative skin, metabolic, or neurological disorders.

Diagram visualizing the overflow of acetylcholine to adjacent mast cells.

==== Pathophysiology ====
The wheals, hypohidrosis, and pain seems to result from the low expression levels of acetylcholinesterase (AchE) and cholinergic receptor, muscarinic 3 (CHRM3) in the eccrine gland epithelial cells.

Elevated expression levels of CCL2/MCP-1, CCL5/RANTES and CCL17/TARC which result in chemoattracted CD4+ and CD8+ T cell populations to the surrounding area may be responsible for exerting a downmodulatory effect on the AchE and CHRM3 expressions.

Corticosteroid inhibits the expressions of CCL2/MCP-1, CCL5/RANTES and CCL17/TARC. This further support the notion that CCL2/MCP-1, CCL5/RANTES and CCL17/TARC play a crucial role.

==== Treatment ====
- First-line treatment: H1RAs are first-line therapy for patients with CholU, but many patients show only a mild to moderate response to standard H1RA doses. The addition of an H2RA was reported to be effective in patients with refractory CholU that was unresponsive to up-dosing of an H1RA. Other studies have demonstrated the efficacy of scopolamine butylbromide (an anticholinergic agent); combinations of propranolol (a b2-adrenergic blocker), antihistamines, and montelukast; and treatment and injection with botulinum toxin.
- Non-pharmacological treatment: In the absence of sweat, cold-water sprays and wet towels can be used to increase the evaporative loss of heat from the skin. Shifting to a cooler or air-conditioned environments when necessary can also reduce discomfort. In the event of severe hyperthermia (body temperature >106 °F/41 °C), drastic measures such as immersion in ice-cold water are necessary to prevent irreversible brain damage.

== Prevalence ==
Although overall research is limited, several studies suggest that CU is relatively common, with reported prevalence rates ranging from 5% to 20% among urticaria case (depending on locale, race, and age). The condition is more common in young adults, and prevalence appears to peak in adults aged 26–28 (up to 20%). The vast majority of cases are reported to be mild, and proportionally few individuals seek medical attention regarding the condition.

== History ==
Cholinergic urticaria was first described by Duke in 1924 as "urticaria calorica". The term cholinergic is derived from the finding that hives similar to those of CU can be evoked using cholinergic agonists (e.g. methacholine).

== See also ==
- Miliaria
- Exercise-induced anaphylaxis
- Idiopathic pure sudomotor failure
- Hypohidrosis
- Fabry disease
- Aquagenic urticaria
