= Jean-Denis Barbié du Bocage =

French geographer (1760–1825)

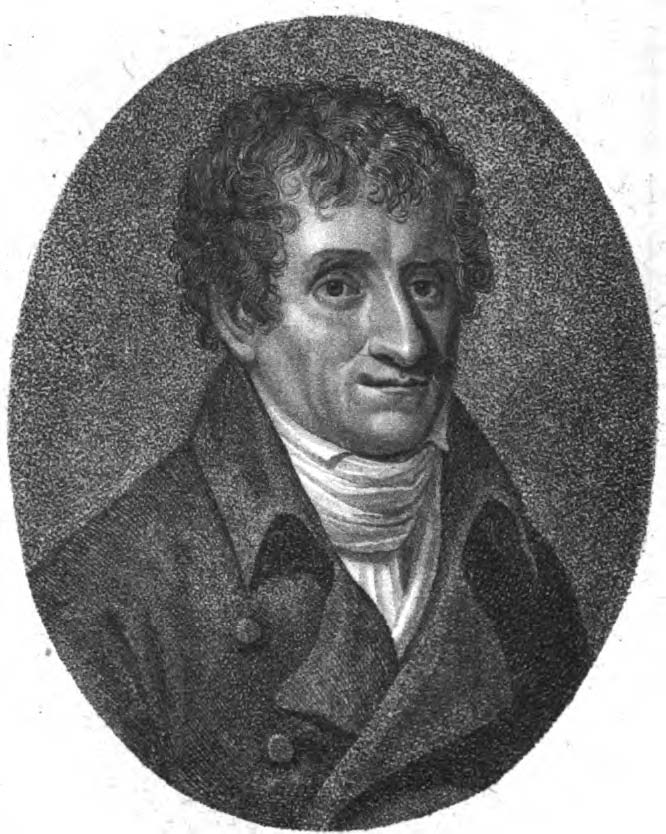

Jean-Denis Barbié (28 April 1760 – 28 December 1825) was a French geographer and cartographer, dean of the Faculté de lettres de Paris and a member of the Institut de France. He was also known as Barbié du Bocage and Barbier du Bocage.

== Life ==
He was born in Paris to an architect and engraver from a bourgeois family from Normandy. He was orphaned aged nine, studied at the collège Mazarin and worked for a time in a prosecutor's chambers, where he had been sent by his mother, who hoped he would become one himself. Instead, in 1777, he became the only pupil of Jean-Baptiste Bourguignon d'Anville (1697–1782), first geographer to the King, who became a member of the Académie des inscriptions et belles-lettres in 1754 and of the Académie royale des sciences in 1773. d'Anville trained him in geography and in 1786 Barbié added the new discoveries up to their time to d'Anville's world map.

In 1780, aged 20, he was attached to Louis XVI's foreign ministry under Charles Gravier de Vergennes (1719–1787), then from 1785 to the Cabinet des médailles in the King's Library, then headed by abbé Barthélémy, producing the maps for the latter's Voyage du jeune Anarchis (The Young Anarchis's Journey). In 1792 he was put in charge of that library's geography section, but was dismissed from that role during the Reign of Terror after having been imprisoned as a suspect on 2 September 1792.

Under the Directory, in 1797, he was made a member of the geography committee in the office of the registry of the Interior Minister. Under the Consulate, in 1802, he was put in charge of several geographical projects run by the Ministry of War, including the 'carte de Morée' of the Peloponnese for the First Consul Napoleon, who would have had it sealed to give him the monopoly on using it. From 1803 to 1809 he geographer to the Foreign Ministry headed by Talleyrand and until 1807 was head of its geography store. In 1804 he drew up a map of Europe for state education. In 1806 he produced a map of the Principality of Benevento (within the Kingdom of Naples and confiscated from the Papal States) for Talleyrand, who had been made prince of that principality by Napoleon, as well as being put at the head of a project to produce a large map of France for the department of Bridges and Roads.

He was also a member of the Institut de France - on 7 November 1806, under the First French Empire he was elected an ordinary member in the Class of History and Ancient Literature, beating the Hellenist J. B. Gail and replacing the historian abbé Louis-Pierre Anquetil-Duperron (1723-1806). Talleyrand was already a member and on Barbié du Bocage's election he saluted the "justice of his spirit" and "the extent of his knowledge". Also in Barbié du Bocage's class were Ameilhon, François-Antoine de Boissy d'Anglas, Joseph Bonaparte, Brial, Champagne, Marie-Gabriel-Florent-Auguste de Choiseul-Gouffier, Clavier, Bon-Joseph Dacier (perpetual secretary from 1782), Pierre-Claude-François Daunou, Desales, Dupont, Gail, Garran de Coulon, Gaussin, Gérando, Ginguené, Gosselin, Grégoire, Louis-Matthieu Langlès, Lakanal, Lanjuinas, Laporte du Teil, Lebreton, Lebrun, Levesque, Mentelle, Mercier, Millin, Antoine Mongez, Pastoret, Petit-Radel, Pougens, Quatremère de Quincy, Charles-Frédéric Reinhard, Antoine-Isaac Silvestre de Sacy, Talleyrand, Toulongeon and Visconti.

In 1809 he became the first professor of ancient and modern geography at the Faculté de lettres de Paris, becoming dean of the Sorbonne in 1815 as successor to Pierre-Paul Royer-Collard, as well as sitting on the academic committee of Paris from 1821. He also taught at the École normale. He had also been a member of the Société d'émulation de Cambrai since 1803 and belonged to several foreign academies, joining the Florence Academy in 1807, the Royal Society of Goetingen in 1808, the Royal Institute of Holland in 1809 as associated member, second class, the Ionian Academy in 1810 and the Prussian Royal Academy in 1811.

On 19 October 1814 he was made a knight of the Légion d'honneur by Louis XVIII and kept his position at the Institut Royal under the First Restoration. When Louis was fully restored after the Hundred Days he made Barbié du Bocage a member of the Académie des inscriptions et belles-lettres, reconstituted by royal decree on 21 March 1816. Also a member of the Royal Society of Antiquaries of France from 1819 onwards, he was its president in 1820 and 1824.

In 1821 he was one of the 217 founder members of the Société de géographie, which "was instituted to compete for the progress of geography; it undertakes voyages to unknown lands; it proposes and awards prizes; it keeps up a correspondence with learned societies, travellers and geographers; it publishes unedited narratives as well as works and engraves maps". He presided over its first constituting meeting at the Hôtel de Ville de Paris on 15 December 1821 and he, Conrad Malte-Brun, Alexandre de Humboldt, Jean-François Champollion and Cuvier were all elected members of the society's central commission or committee.

Specialising in maps of the ancient classical world, he played a part in almost all important French geographical projects of his time and gathered an important collection of maps, geographical documents and 1200 books, all sold after his death in May 1826. Author of a Précis de géographie ancienne (Summary of Ancient Geography), published in 1811 following the Abrégé de géographie (Abstract of Geography) by Pinkerton and Waldkenaer, he is best known for the maps for abbé Jean-Jacques Barthélemy's Voyage du jeune Anacharsis (1788 and 1799) and for the maps he contributed in 1782 (1st volume) and 1824 (2nd volume) to Marie-Gabriel-Florent-Auguste Choiseul-Gouffier's Voyage pittoresque en Grèce (Picturesque Journey in Greece). He died in Paris and is buried in the 11th division of the cimetière du Père-Lachaise.

== Family and issue ==
On 16 February 1792 he married Antoinette Marie Delahaye (1773-1857), daughter of Guillaume-Nicolas Delahaye (1725-1802), chief engraver to the king and godson to the famous geographer Guillaume Delisle (1675-1726). They had four children, including the geographers Jean Guillaume Barbié du Bocage (1793-1843) and Alexandre Barbié du Bocage (1798-1835), their third son Isidore-Louis (later a medical doctor after presenting a thesis on "the eruption of sudamina" in 1828 and a member of the Paris Anatomical Society until his death in 1834) and Marie-Adélaïde-Augustine (who married Antoine Lemoine, professor at the École des ponts et chaussées). Alexander's son Victor Amédée Barbié du Bocage (1832-1890) also became a geographer.

On Guillaume's side, his descendents include the Collin du Bocage family, to which belonged the playwright Louis Verneuil (1893-1952), first married to Lysiane Bernhardt, granddaughter of Sarah Bernhardt, then to Germaine Feydeau, daughter of Georges Feydeau (1862-1921). Alexandre's branch married into the Preaulx then la Tullaye families.

On 12 February 1792 in Paris, Jean-Denis' sister Marie Julie Barbié du Bocage (1766-1846) married the future print dealer and engraver Jacques-Louis Bance (1761-1847) - their son Balthazar Bance (1804-1862) founded the Librairie centrale d'architecture in 1849 and was father of the painter and engraver Albert Bance (1848-1899).

== Publications ==
- Recueil des cartes géographiques, plans, vues et médailles de l'ancienne Grèce, relatifs au voyage du jeune Anacharsis, précédé d'une analyse critique des cartes, 1788.
- Analyse de la carte des marches et de l'Empire d'Alexandre Le Grand, 1804.
- Dictionnaire géographique critique des lieux mentionnés dans les ouvrages de Salluste, 1813.
- Précis de géographie ancienne, 2 vol., 1827.
- Description topographique et historique de la plaine d'Argos et d'une partie de l'Argolide, 1834.

== Iconography ==
- Standing Portrait of M. Dubocage, by Augustin-Désiré Pajou

== Bibliography (in French) ==
- Hugues B. Maret, Une lettre de Talleyrand sur l'élection de Denis Barbié du Bocageà l'Institut en 1806, in: Journal des avants, June 1928, p. 238-241 (www.persee.fr)
- Jacques-Alphonse Mahul, Annuaire nécrologique, ou Supplément annuel et continuation de toutes les biographies ou dictionnaires historiques, 6e, 1825, Paris : Ponthieu, 1826, pages 13–19 .
- Philippe de la Renaudière, Éloge de M. Barbié du Bocage, read before the assembly of the Société de géographie on 1 December 1826.
- Catalogue des livres de la bibliothèque de feu M. Barbié du Bocage, précédé d'une notice historique sur sa vie et ses ouvrages, Paris, 1826.
- Louis Verneuil, Rideau à neuf heures (Souvenirs de Théâtre), Éditions des deux rives, Paris, 1945
- Alexandre Cioranescu, Correspondance de Daniel Démétrius Philippidès et de J.-D. Barbié du Bocage (1794-1819), Institute for Balkan studies, 1965.
- Dominique Lejeune, Les sociétés de géographie en France et l'expansion coloniale au XIXeme siecle, Éditions Albin Michel, 1993.
- Institut de France, Histoire des cinq académies, Perrin, 1995.
- Frédéric Hitzel, Dictionnaire des orientalistes de langue française, Éditions Karthala, 2008.
- Frédéric Barbier, Le rêve grec de Monsieur de Choiseul (Les voyages d'un européen des Lumières), Armand Colin, 2010.
- François Huguet et Boris Noguès, "Les professeurs des facultés de lettres et sciences en France au XIXeme siecle (1808-1880)", June 2011
