= Jean-Pierre-Marie Jazet =

French engraver (1788–1871)

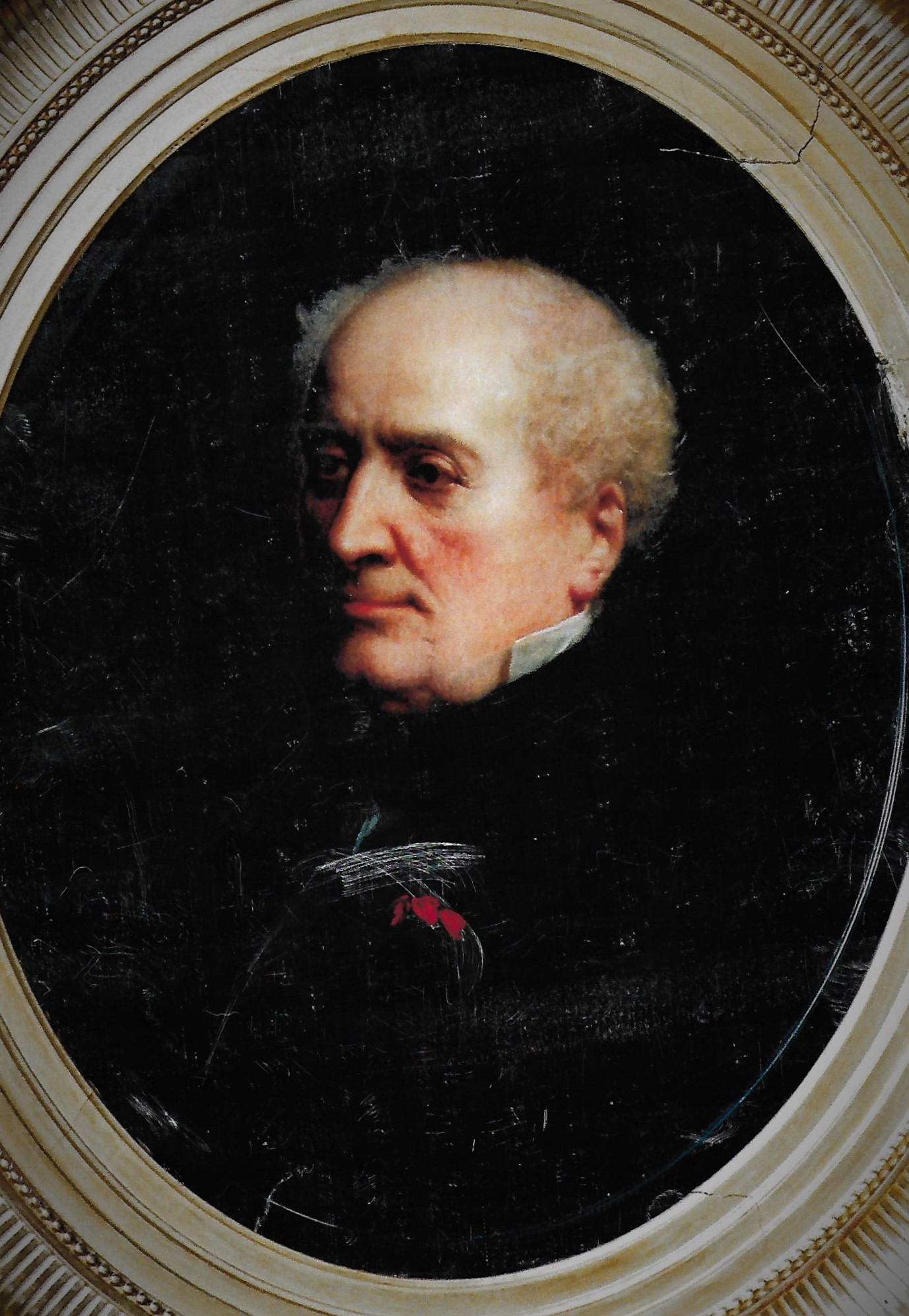
Jazet by Charles Landelle (private collection).

Jean-Pierre-Marie Jazet (31 July 1788 – 16 August 1871) was a French engraver known for his etchings, aquatints and mezzotints.

== Life ==
His father was Jean-Marie Jazet, verifier of the crown's buildings, who was mortally wounded in 1793 by an exploding cannon whilst serving in the Paris National Guard, when Jean-Pierre-Marie was only five. His mother was Jeanne Marquant, sister of Suzanne Marquant, second wife of the painter and engraver Philibert-Louis Debucourt.

After his father's death, Jean-Pierre-Marie was raised by his mother's brother Debucourt, becoming one of his best pupils. For his art, Jazet learned and used burin, aquatint, stipple and etching. Jean-Pierre-Marie Jazet mainly produced his compositions at night. He mainly worked on genres favoured by his uncle and sold them to print dealers to help his mother financially. Later, still faithful to his master, he accompanied him until his death - Debucourt, who could no longer work, had spent considerable sums and his nephew helped him to end his life peacefully.

Jazet began exhibiting in 1817. He began his peak period two years later with engravings after Jacques-Louis-David's The Coronation of Napoleon, Antoine-Jean Gros's Standing Portrait of général Lassalle, Horace Vernet's The Bivouac of Colonel Moncey and François-Joseph Heim's Distribution of Prizes at the 1824 Salon. His many engravings, particularly those realised after Vernet's works and on subjects from Napoleon I's life and the First French Empire, then his regular exhibiting at the Paris Salon gained him a major reputation.

To sell prints drawn from matrices which formed his oeuvre and to keep up and expand his presence in the art market, Jazet was mainly his own editor, working from 71 fauborg Saint-Martin then 7 rue de Lancry. Next he published via Aumont & Cie and Charles Bance. When his son-in-law Théodore Vibert began working with Adolphe Goupil, Jazet himself published almost exclusively via Goupil Vibert & Cie, then Goupil & Cie after Théodore Vibert's death in 1850. Jazet's commercial policy and foreigners' presence on the Parisian art market allowed his works to be published far beyond France. He died at Yerres.

Considered for years as one of the best French engravers, he last exhibited at the 1865 Paris Salon after a major output, principally in aquatint. Art criticism early in the 20th century held that he raised that medium to such a level of perfection that it ended up losing its natural expression. His last works were sometimes qualified by a "regrettable weakness".

== Marriage and issue ==
Jean-Pierre-Marie Jazet married Félicité Moreau. Their two sons Alexandre-Jean-Louis (born 10 May 1814) and Eugène-Pontus (born 1 May 1816) were both engravers, whilst their daughter Louise-Georgina (born 29 September 1822) married Théodore Vibert, with whom she had Jean-Georges Vibert and Alice Vibert, the latter marrying Étienne-Prosper Berne-Bellecour.

== Recognition ==
- 2nd class medal, 1819
- Knight of the Légion d'honneur, 8 October 1846

== Gallery ==
Works by Jean-Pierre-Marie Jazet

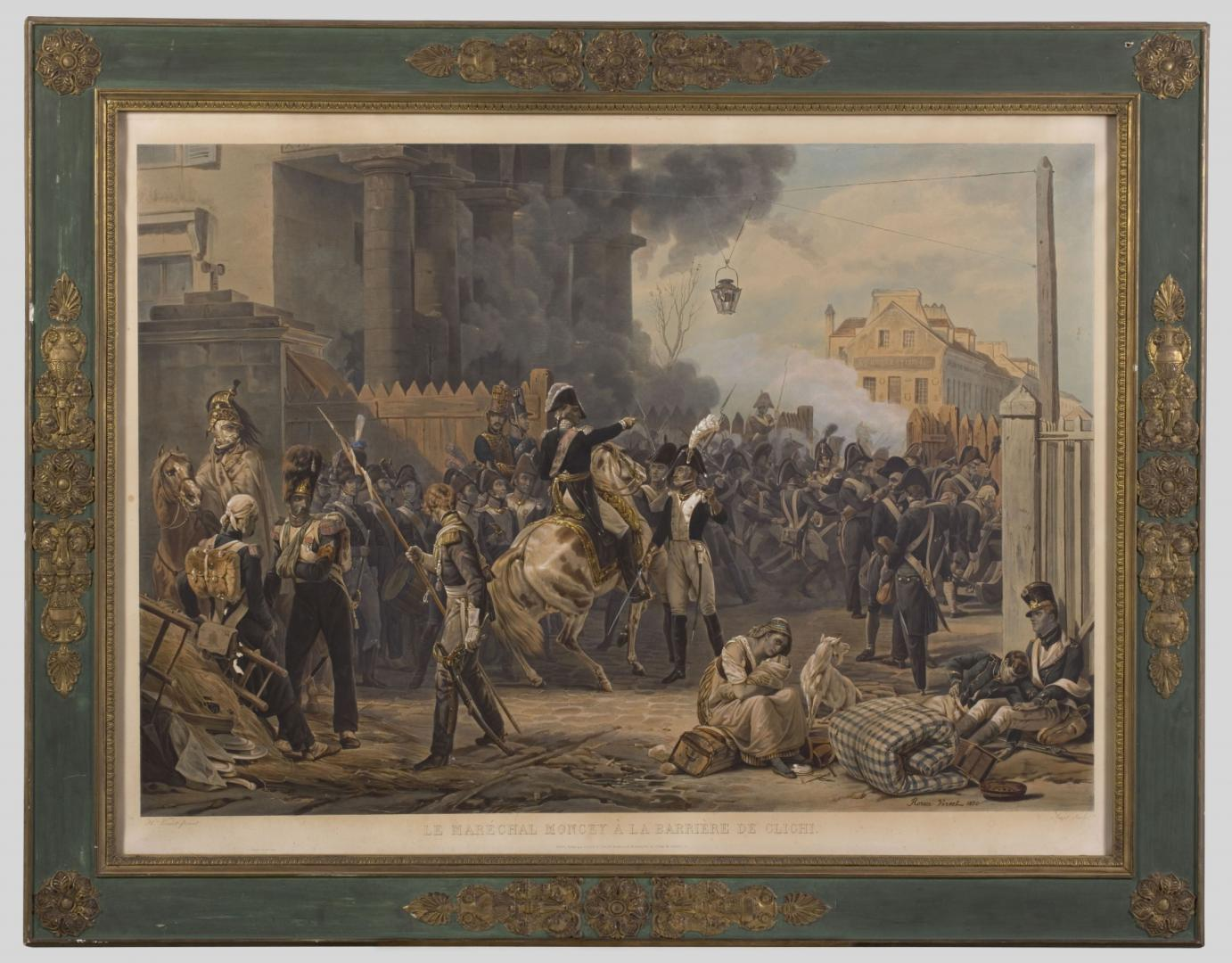
Marshal Monsey at the barrière de Clichy, after Horace Vernet, musée Carnavalet.

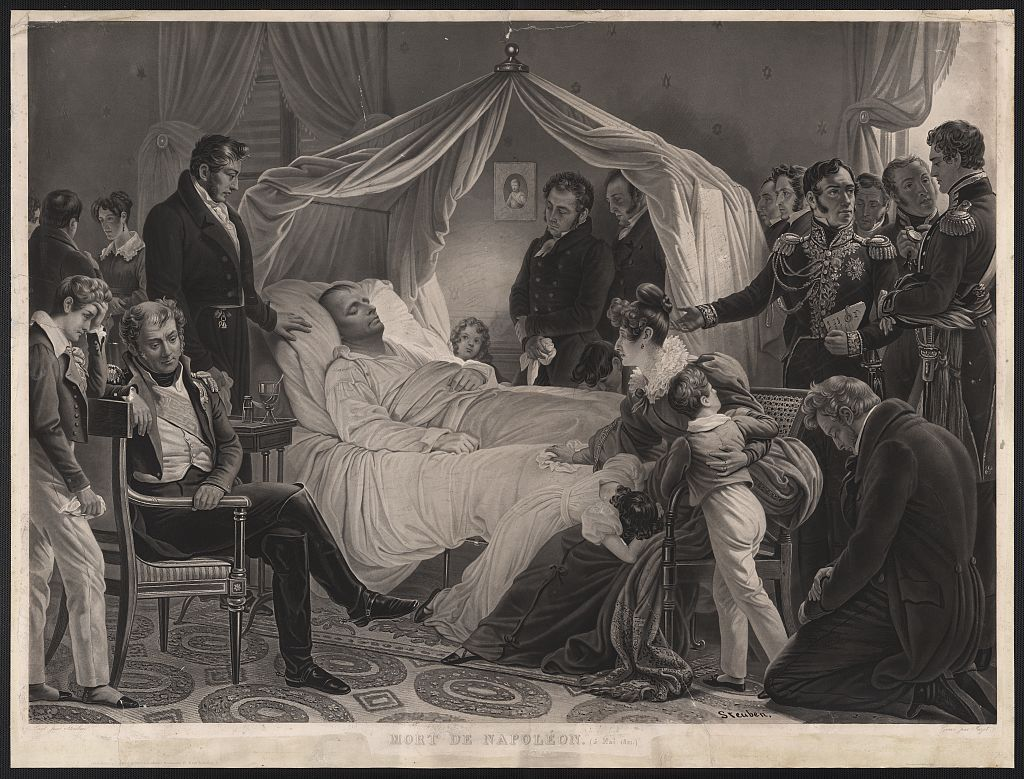
The Death of Napoleon, after Charles de Steuben. (1860)

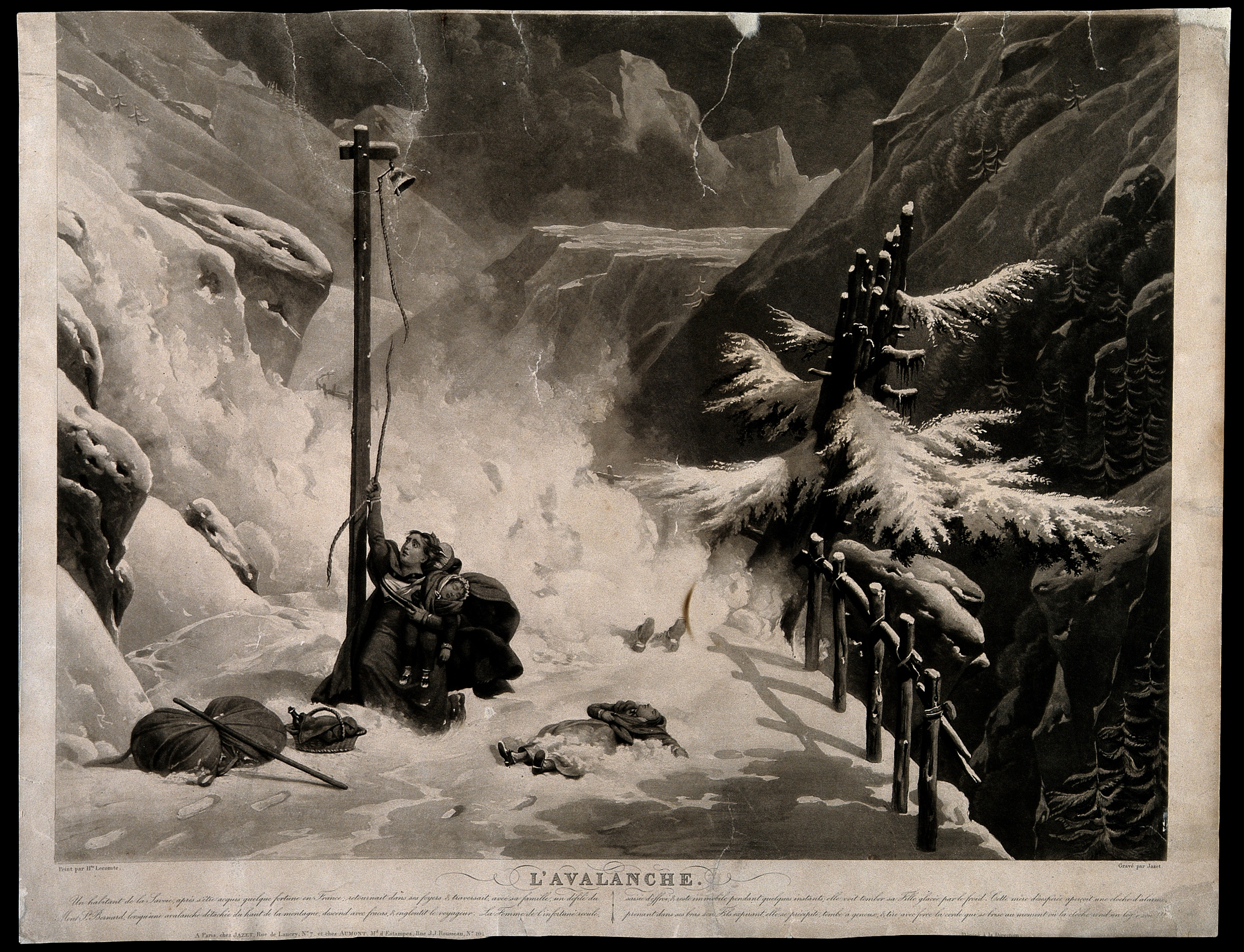
The Avalanche after Hippolyte Lecomte.

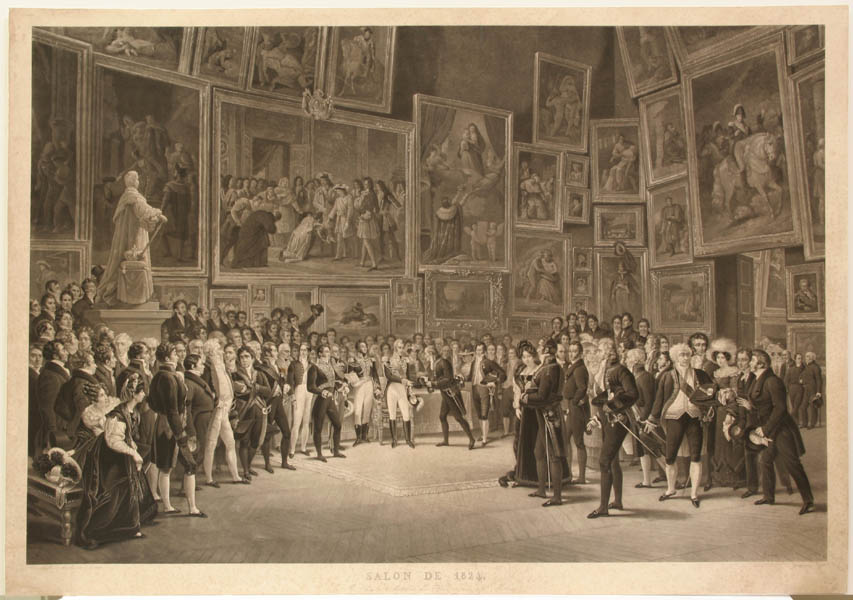
Salon of 1824 after François-Joseph Heim.

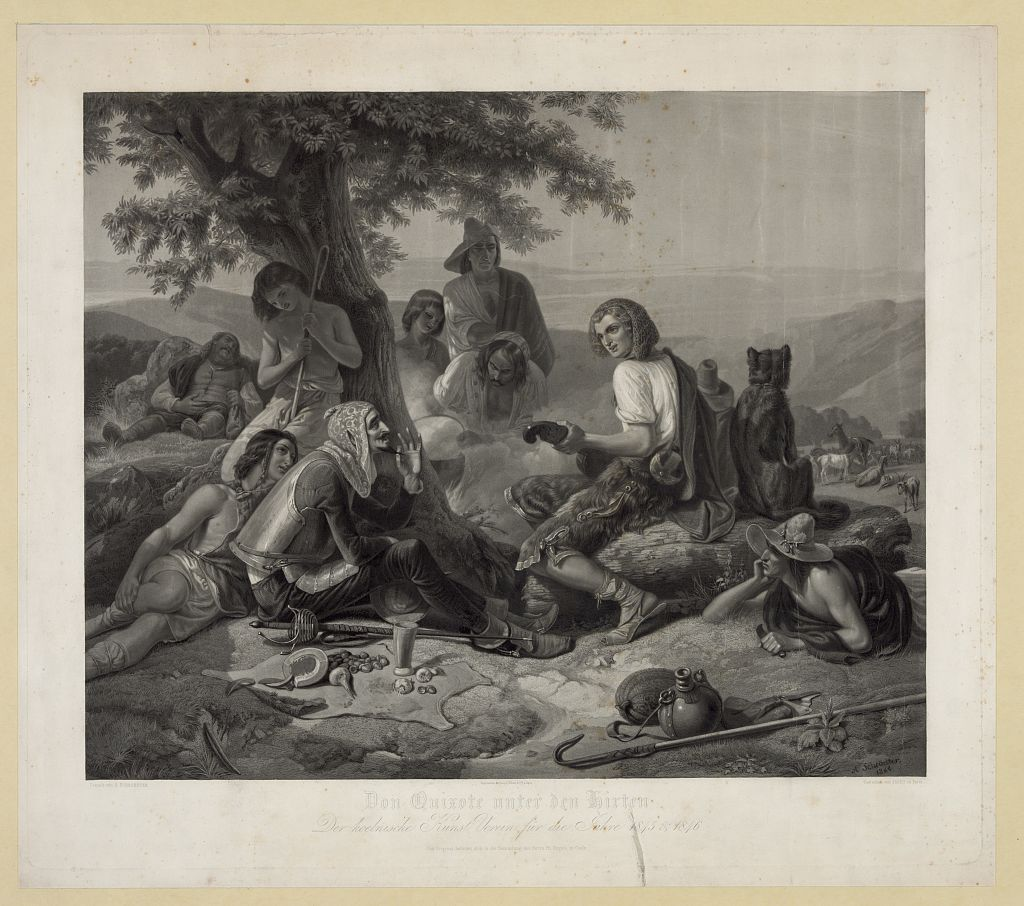
Don Quixote with the Shepherds, after Adolph Schroedter. (1845)

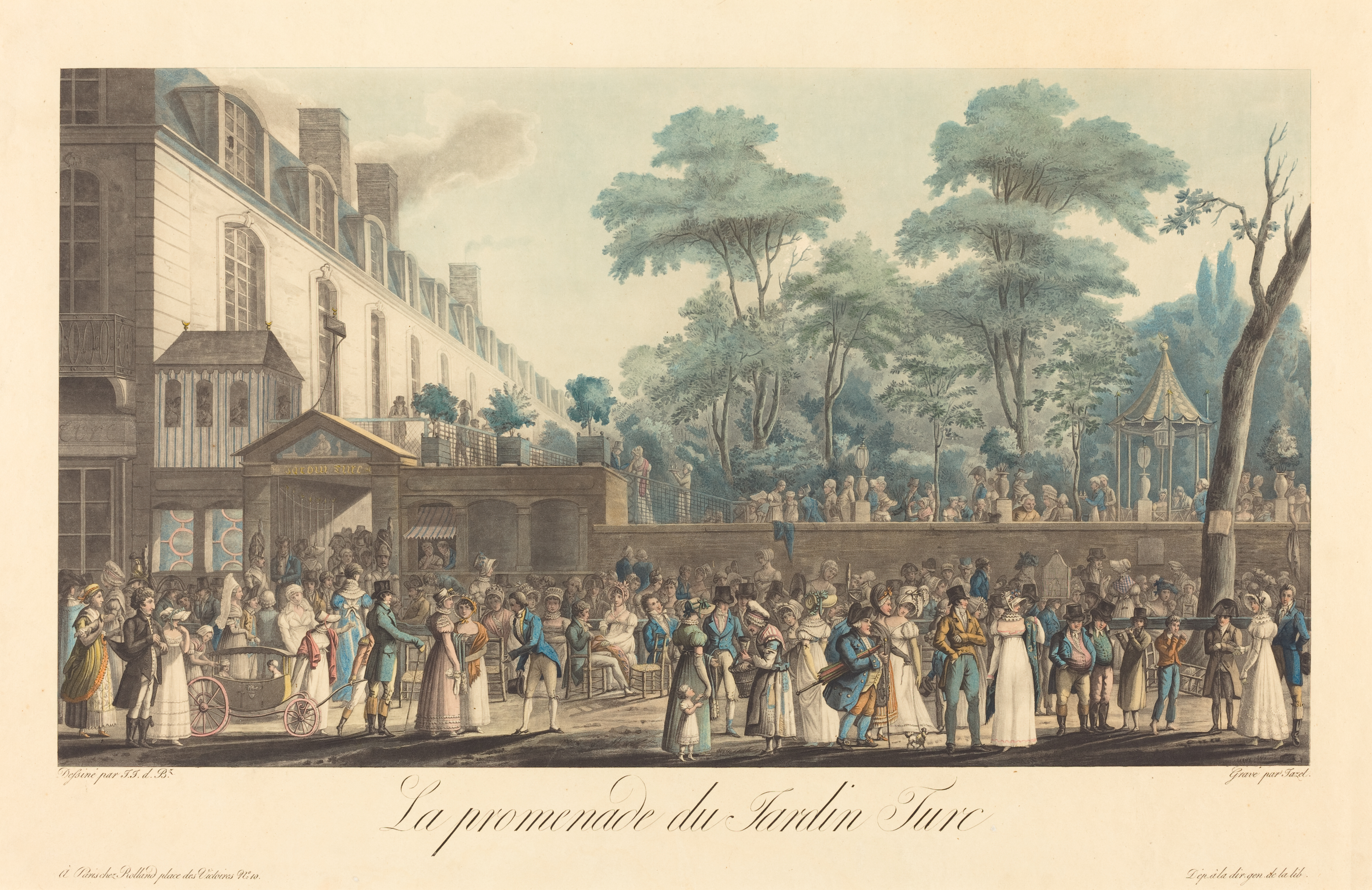
Walk in the Turkish Garden, after Jean-Joseph Bastier de Bez, National Gallery of Art.

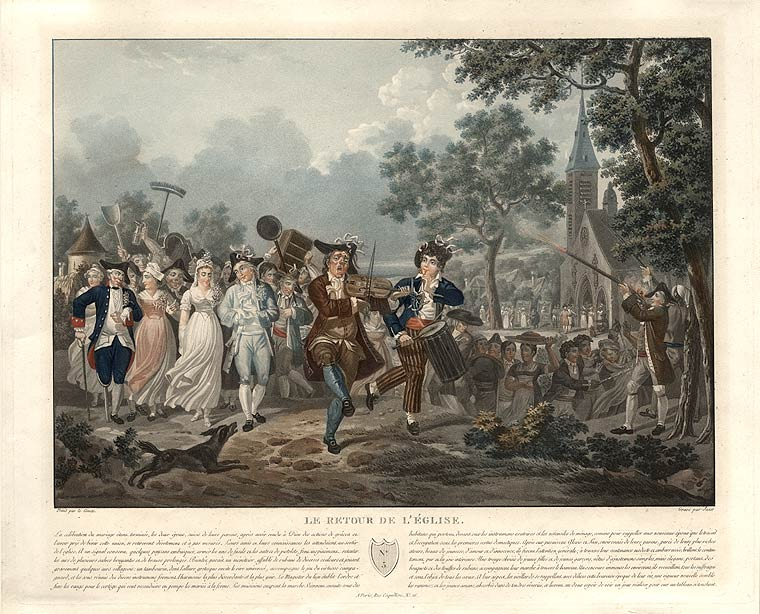
Returning from the Church, after Hippolyte Lecomte. (1815)

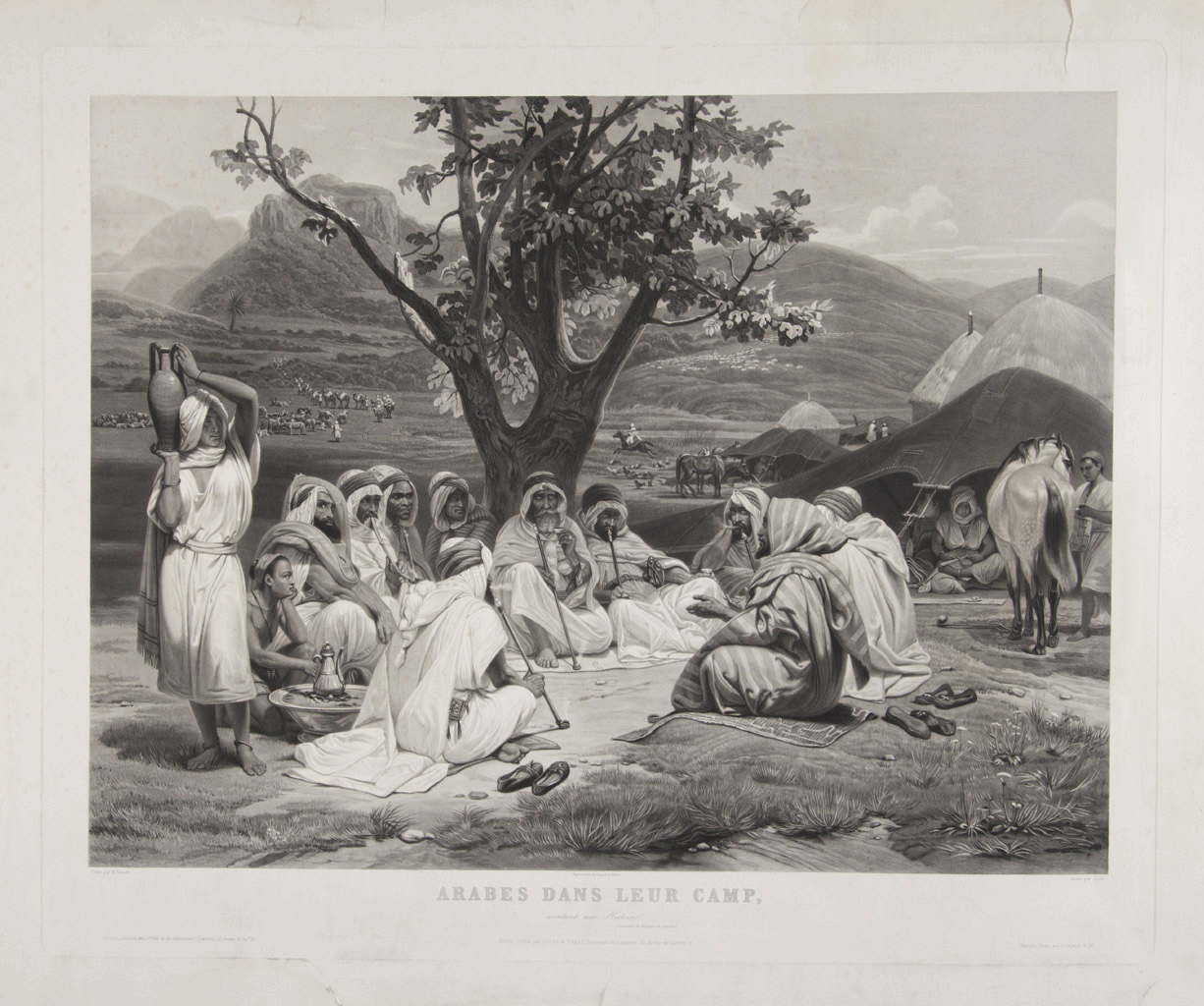
Arabs in their Camp, after Horace Vernet, Musée des Beaux-Arts de Bordeaux.

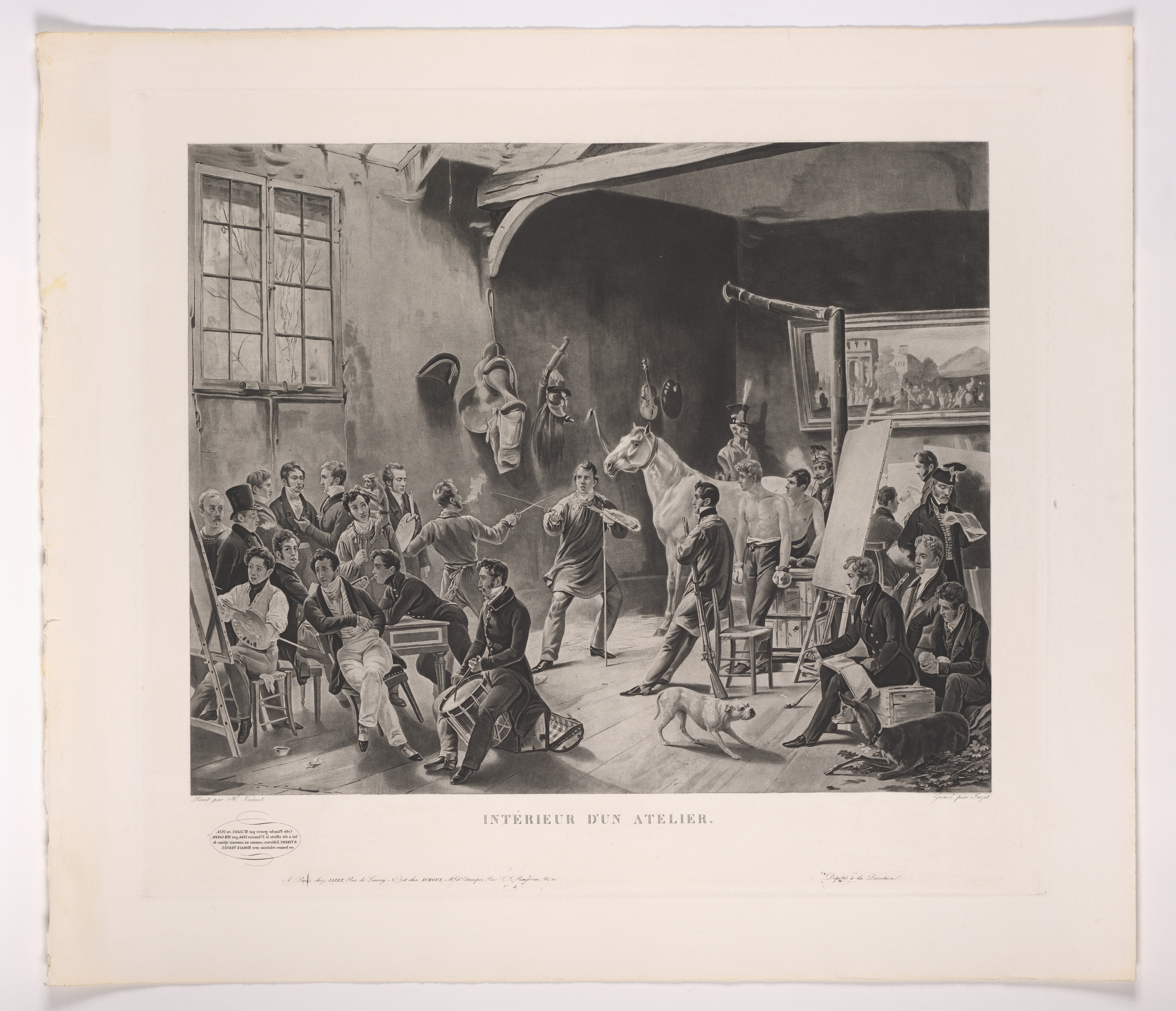
The Studio of Horace Vernet (Interior of a Studio), after Horace Vernet, (1824), Metropolitan Museum of Art.

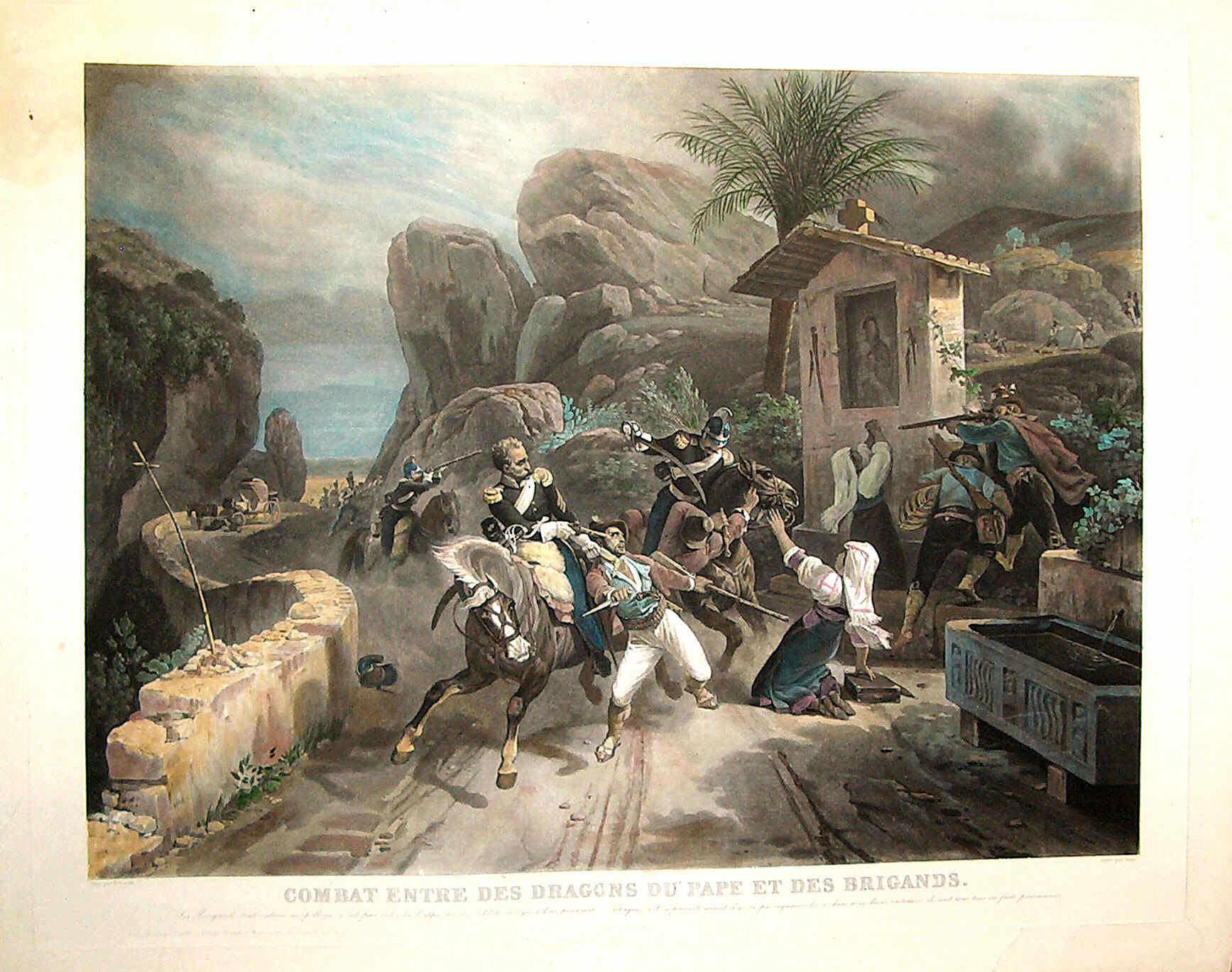
Battle between Papal Dragoons and Brigands, after Horace Vernet. (1840)

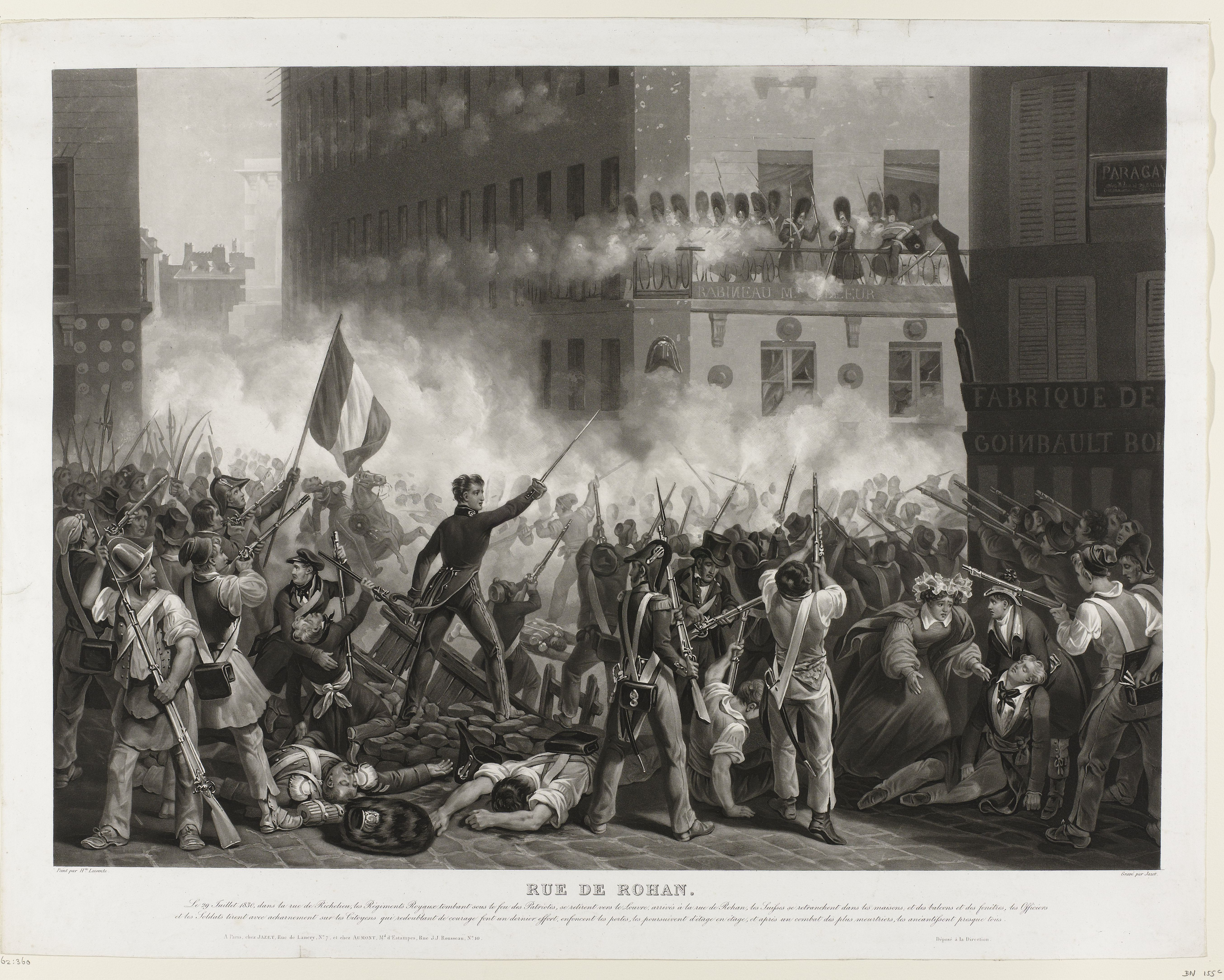
Rue de Rohan, after Hippolyte Lecomte, (1831), Rijksmuseum, Amsterdam.

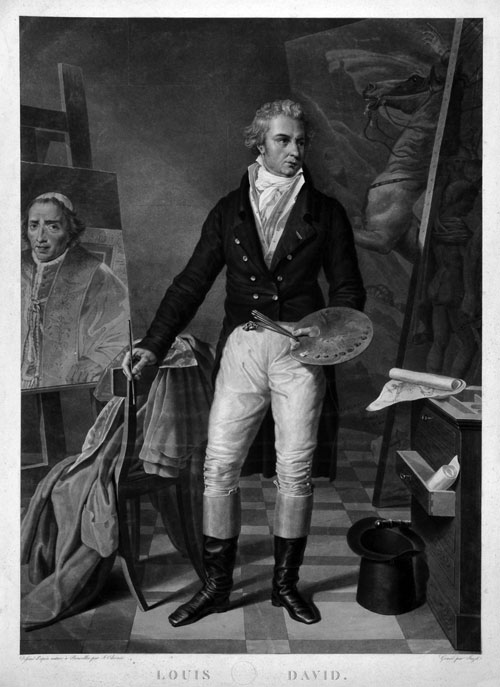
Jacques-Louis David in his Studio. after Joseph-Denis Odevear.

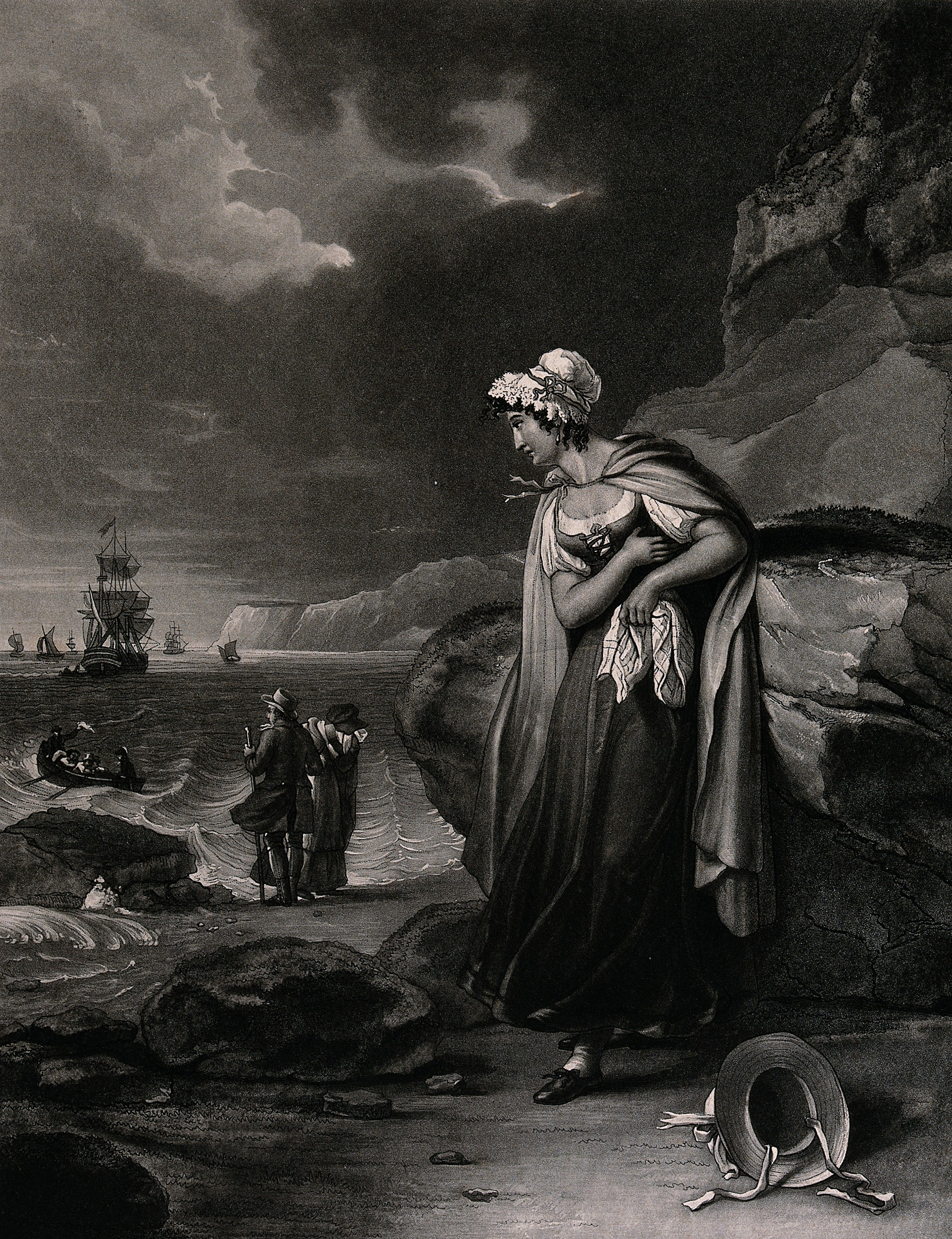
A young woman watching from a beach while a rowing boat carr. after Henry Corbould.

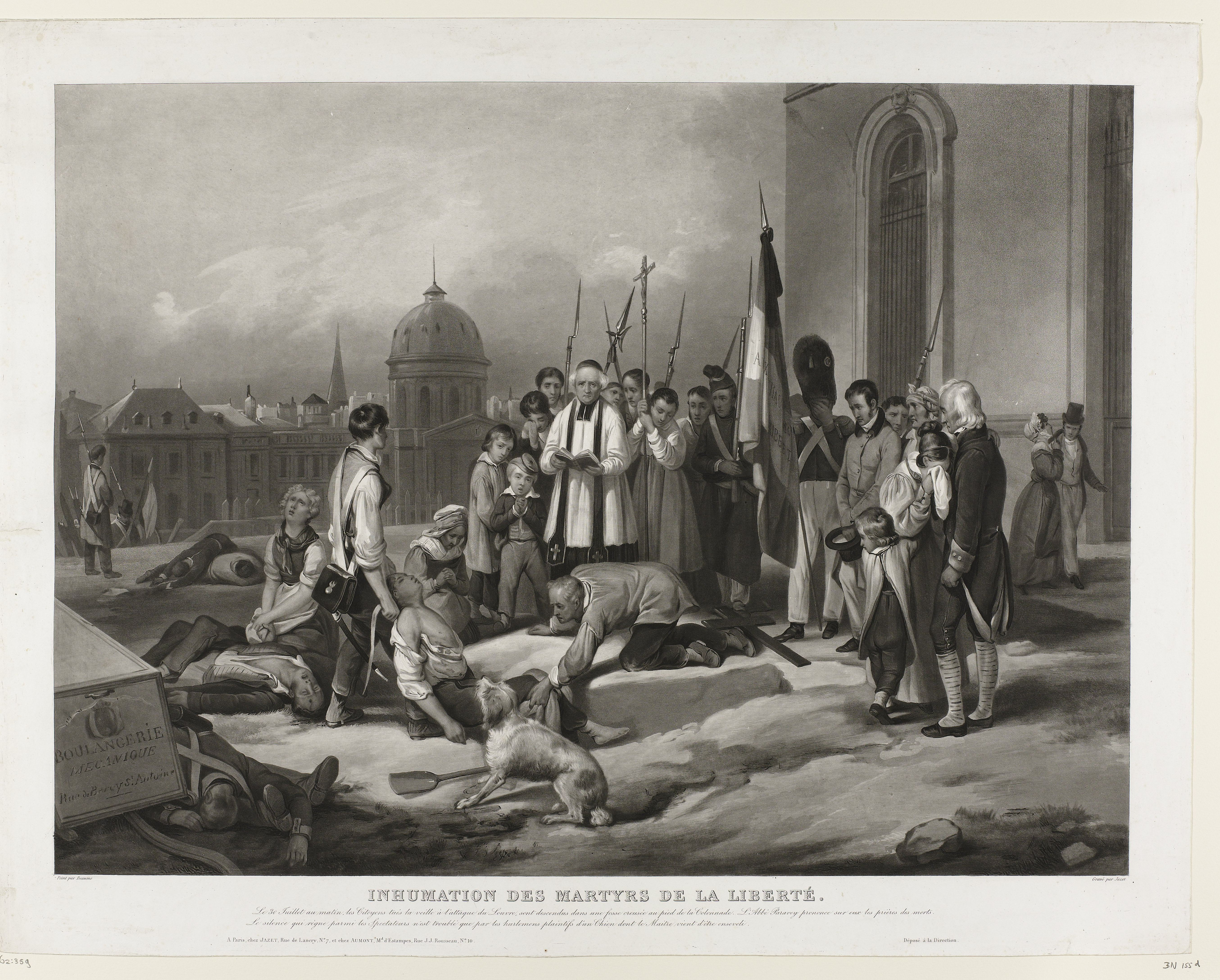
Burial of the Martyrs for Liberty, after Joseph Beaume, (1831), Rijksmuseum, Amsterdam.

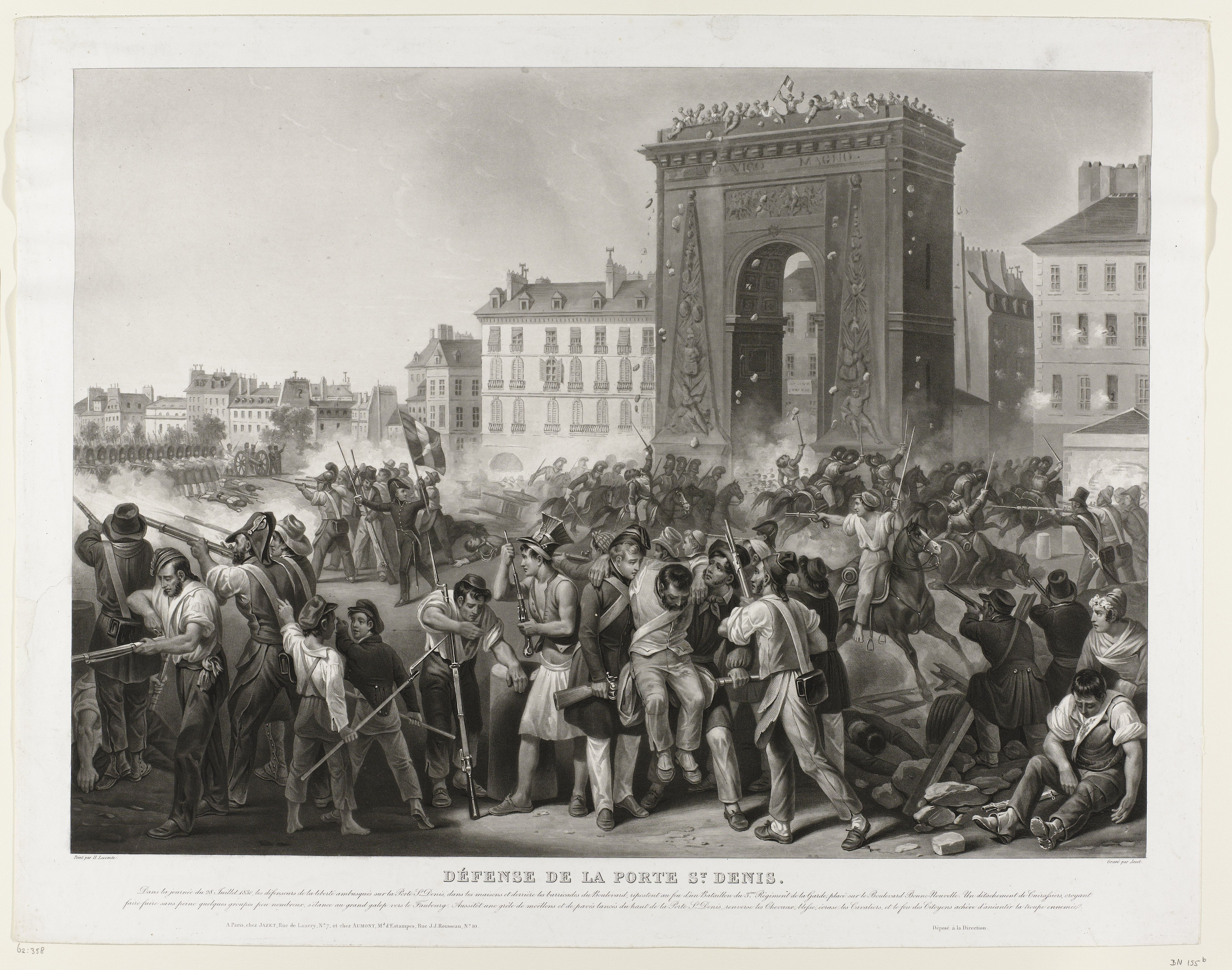
Defence of the porte Saint-Denis, after Hippolyte Lecomte, (1831), Rikjsmuseum, Amsterdam.

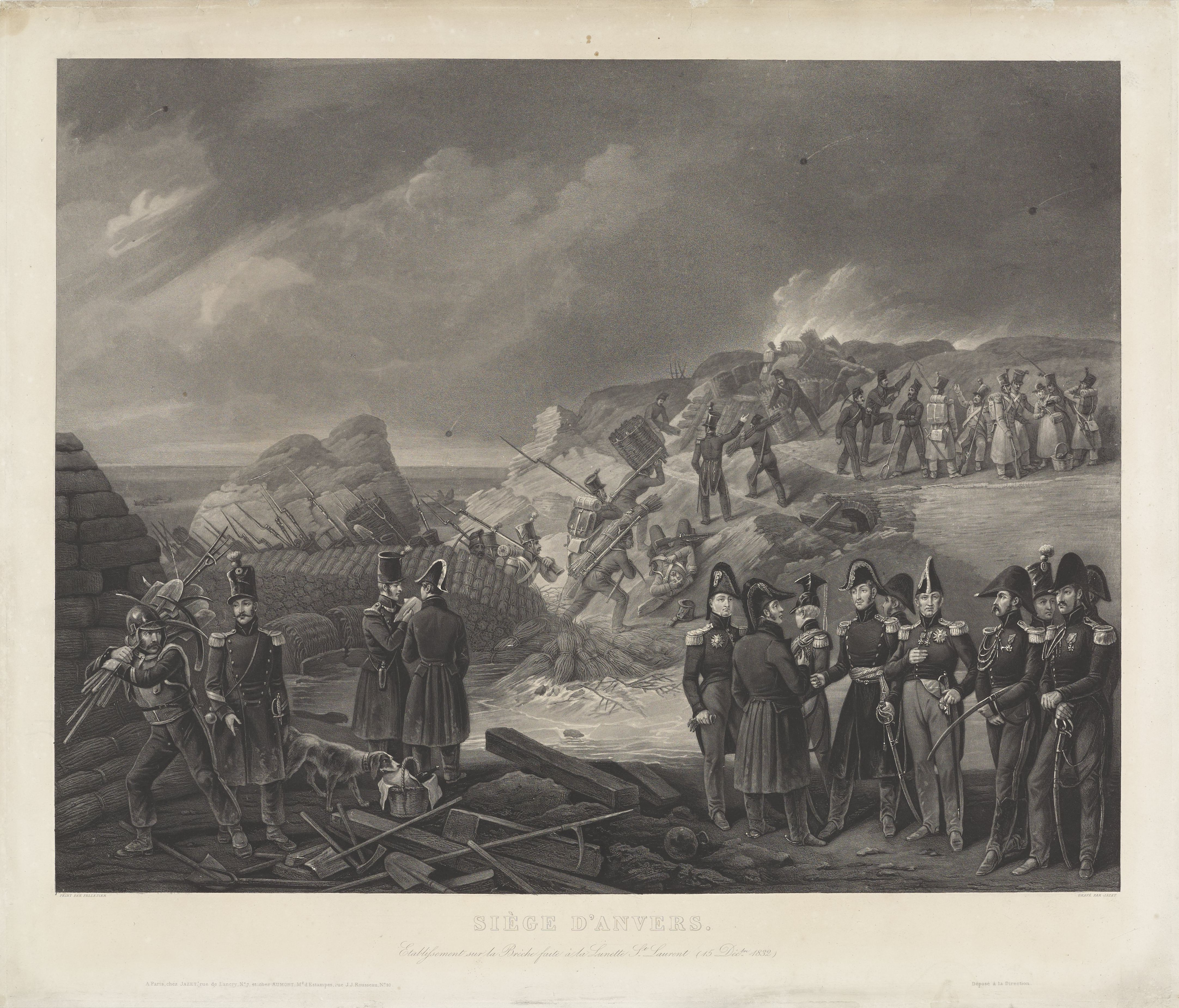
Siege of Antwerp, (1832–1833), after Laurent-Joseph Pelletier, Rijksmuseum, Amsterdam.

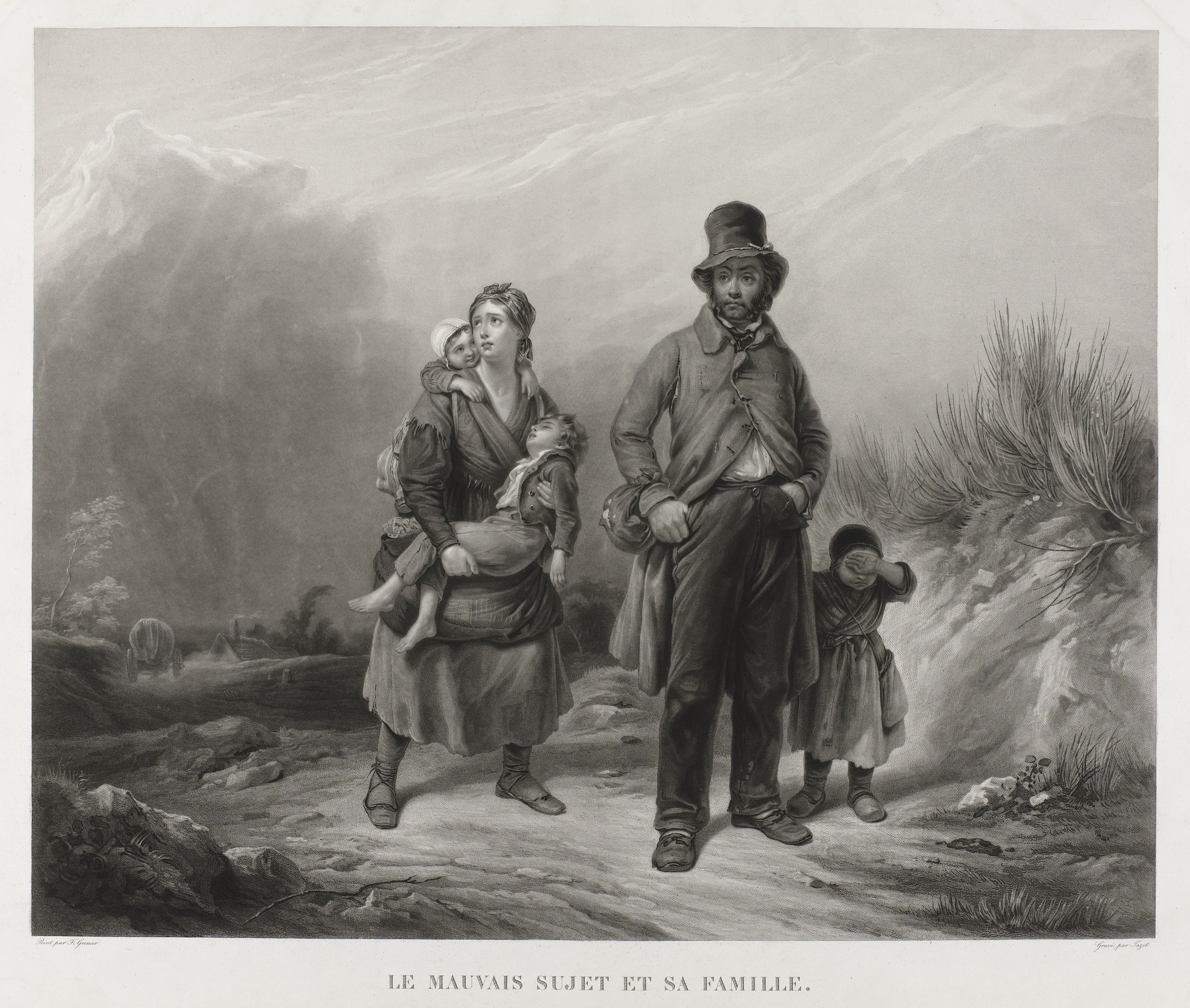
The Bad Subject and his Family, after François Grenier de Saint Martin, (1832), Rijksmuseum, Amsterdam.

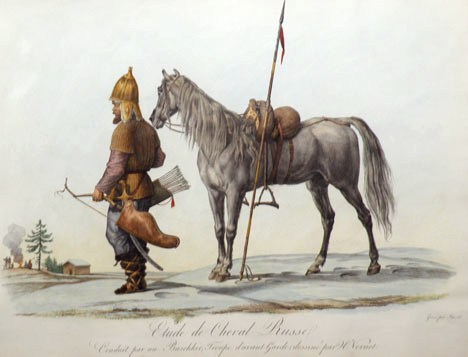
Study of a Russian horse, after Horace Vernet. (1840)
