= Alexandre Barbié du Bocage =

French geographer and lawyer

Alexandre François Barbié du Bocage (14 September 1798 – 25 February 1835) was a French geographer and lawyer. He was also a professor at the Faculté des lettres de Paris. His father Jean-Denis and other family members were also noted geographers.
