= Jacques-Louis Bance =

French publisher (1761-1847)

Jacques-Louis or J. -L. Bance (17 April 1761 - 26 March 1847) was a French print dealer, publisher, engraver and artist. He was also known as Bance the Elder to distinguish him from his brother Charles, also an engraver and print dealer.

== Life ==
Born in Claville to a farmer, he was orphaned aged nine and apprenticed to a master saddler in Évreux. He left to work in Normandy as a companion saddler before setting up a business in Paris in 1787 as a master saddler. He first produced an engraving in 1789 and particularly focussed on historic scenes. He became a publisher and print dealer. To export prints he invented a system allowing him to transport them under glass - his method remains secret. He specialised in publishing books of figures and architectural periodicals such as Etudes relatives a l'art des constructions (Relative Studies on the Art of Construction; 1823-1828). From 1831 to 1846 he traded with his son Balthazar Bance (1804-1862) as "Bance aîné et successeur" (Bance the Elder and [his] successor).

He became the brother-in-law of Jean-Denis Barbié du Bocage in February 1792 then the father-in-law of the print dealer Jean-Baptiste Caillard (1776-1833). He died in Paris in 1847 (having stopped work as an engraver only the year before) and his son inherited his business. His body rests in the 18th division of the cimetière du Père-Lachaise under a small monument (belonging to the family of Hervé Bernard, great-grandfather of admiral Henri Rieunier), with the inscription "Bienfaiteur de Claville" ("Benefactor of Claville").

== Work ==
He mainly produced drawings and engravings in burin and etching on symbolic patriotic themes.
