= Yao syndrome =

Autoinflammatory disease

Yao syndrome (YAOS), formerly called NOD2-associated autoinflammatory disease, is an autoinflammatory syndrome involving episodes of fever and abnormal inflammation affecting many parts of the body, particularly the skin, joints, and gastrointestinal system.

== Signs and symptoms ==
- Arthralgia (Arthritis)
- Fever
- Diarrhea
- Abdominal pain
- Keratoconjunctivitis sicca (Dry eyes)
- Pleurisy
- Idiopathic pericarditis
- Xerostomia (Dry mouth)
- Erythematous plaques
- Dermatitis

== Diagnostic criteria ==
Yao syndrome is diagnosed if 2 major criteria, at least one minor criterion, the molecular criterion, and exclusion criteria are fulfilled.

Clinical Criteria	Comments
Major	
1	Periodic occurrence ≥ twice
2	Recurrent fever or dermatitis or both
Minor	
1	Polyarthralgia/inflammatory arthritis, or distal extremity swelling
2	Abdominal pain or diarrhea or both
3	Sicca-like symptoms
4	Pericarditis or pleuritis or both
Molecular Criterion	NOD2 IVS8+158 or R702W or both, or other rare variants
Exclusion Criteria	High titer antinuclear antibodies, inflammatory bowel disease, Blau syndrome, adult sarcoidosis, primary Sjögren syndrome and monogenic autoinflammatory diseases

== Treatment ==
A study to determine the effectiveness of Novartis pharmaceutical drug canakinumab was conducted. In this study, canakinumab was effective in patients with YAOS, and thus clinical trial of canakinumab may be warranted as a therapeutic option for this disease.

== Inheritance ==
Yao syndrome inheritance is classified as multifactorial inheritance.
