= Idiopathic pure sudomotor failure =

- Specialty: Dermatology

Idiopathic pure sudomotor failure (IPSF) is the most common cause of a rare disorder known as acquired idiopathic generalized anhidrosis (AIGA), a clinical syndrome characterized by generalized decrease or absence of sweating without other autonomic and somatic nervous dysfunctions and without persistent organic cutaneous lesions.

The term IPSF was first introduced in 1994 after researchers at Saitama Medical School speculated the primary lesion sites in patients were within cholinergic receptors of the sweat glands. The term IPSF represent a distinct subgroup of AIGA without sudomotor neuropathy or sweat gland failure.

== Clinical features ==
- Early onset in life
- Acute or sudden onset
- Concomitant sharp pain or cholinergic urticaria over the entire body
- Absence of other autonomic dysfunction
- Elevated serum IgE levels
- Marked response to glucocorticoids
- Preserved apocrine sweating (adrenergic innervation)

== Pathology ==
Intracutaneous injection of pilocarpine (sweat gland stimulant) is known to evoke no sweat response, indicating that lesions are on the post-synaptic side of the nerve-sweat gland junction.

The proposed pathomechanisms of idiopathic pure sudomotor failure include:

- A deficit within muscarinic cholinergic receptors of the eccrine sweat glands.
- Interference in acetylcholine transmission to cholinergic receptors.
- A cross-reactive immune response which interferes with cholinergic transmission in the eccrine glands.
- Components of an immediate-type allergy (based on the dramatic resumption of axon reflex sweating following glucocorticoid treatment).

== Diagnosis ==
IPSF is a diagnosis made after ruling out other possible causes. It involves a lack of sweating all over the body, excluding certain congenital and acquired conditions. IPSF is characterized by the absence of sweating on the palms and soles, along with cholinergic urticaria. Skin biopsy and specific markers can help distinguish IPSF from other sweat-related conditions.

== Management ==
Treatment of AIGA almost always consists of steroid pulse therapy or high-dose oral steroids and is not consistently effective. Much remains unclear regarding the reasons for recurrent anhidrosis.

== Epidemiology ==
The overwhelming majority of reported AIGA patients are Japanese, but whether AIGA is truly rare in whites or has been simply underreported by Western physicians remains unclear.

AIGA is most prevalent among young men. In a 64 case review of the literature 58 reported cases were males and 6 female, with a mean age of onset at 28 ± 11 years. Cholinergic urticaria or sharp pain over the entire body induced by elevated body temperature was reported in 32 cases (50%). Of 28 cases tested, 12 (43%) displayed elevated serum IgE levels. Skin biopsy was performed in 53 cases, with normal findings in 20 cases (38%), and cellular infiltrates in sweat glands or ducts in 23 cases (43%).

== See also ==
- Hypohidrosis
