= Microneurography =

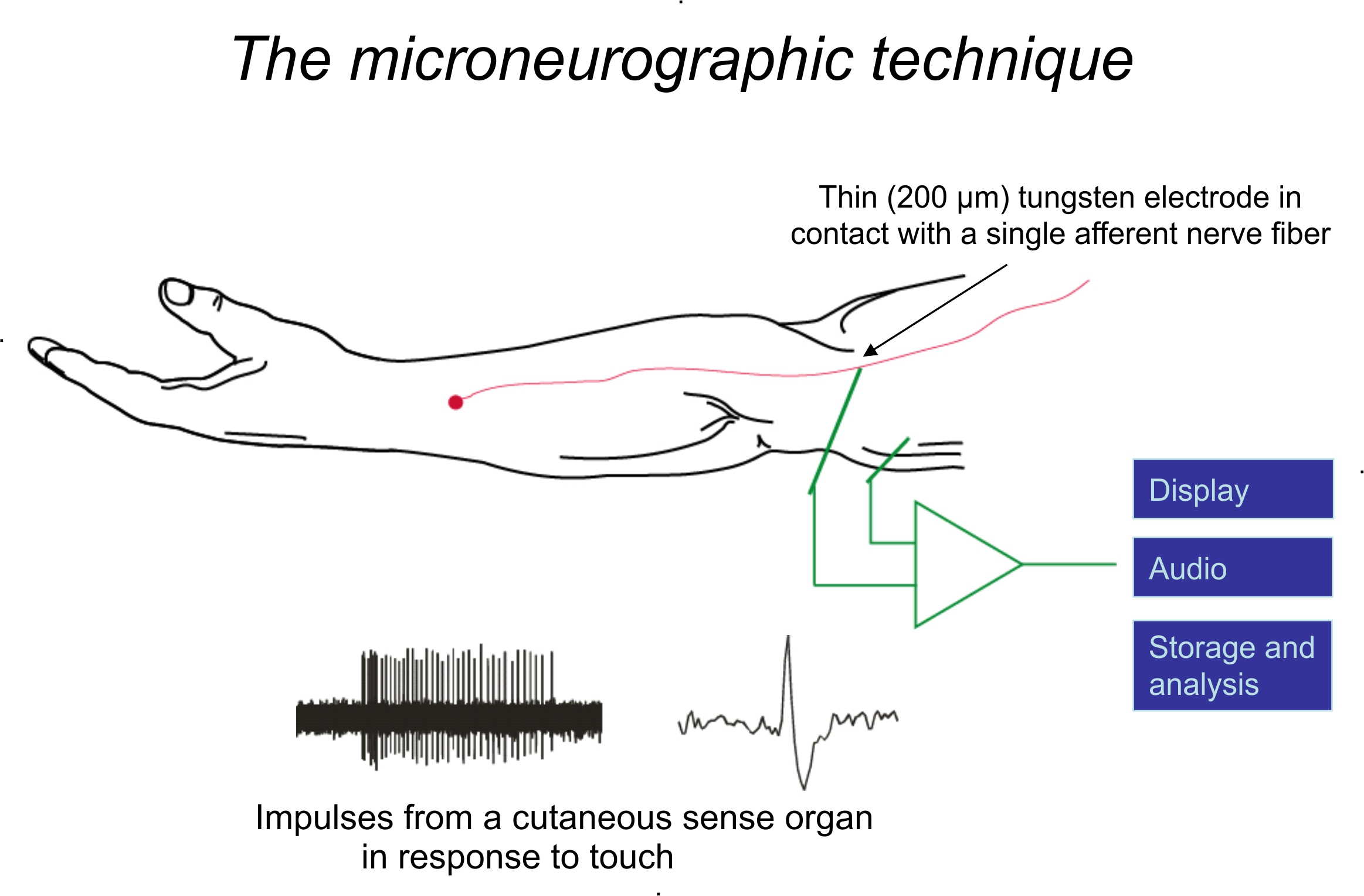
- Schematic illustration of experimental setup for recording nerve impulses from a touch afferent in the hairy skin of a human arm. A series of single unit impulses in response to a touch stimulus are shown as well as one of the impulses on expanded time scale to demonstrate impulse shape.
- Purpose: record the normal traffic of nerve impulses that are conducted in peripheral nerves

Microneurography is a neurophysiological method employed to visualize and record the traffic of nerve impulses that are conducted in peripheral nerves of waking human subjects. It can also be used in animal recordings. The method has been successfully employed to reveal functional properties of a number of neural systems, e.g. sensory systems related to touch, pain, and muscle sense as well as sympathetic activity controlling the constriction state of blood vessels. To study nerve impulses of an identified nerve, a fine tungsten needle microelectrode is inserted into the nerve and connected to a high input impedance differential amplifier. The exact position of the electrode tip within the nerve is then adjusted in minute steps until the electrode discriminates nerve impulses of interest. A unique feature and a significant strength of the microneurography method is that subjects are fully awake and able to cooperate in tests requiring mental attention, while impulses in a representative nerve fibre or set of nerve fibres are recorded, e.g. when cutaneous sense organs are stimulated or subjects perform voluntary precision movements.

== History ==
Before the microneurography technique was developed in the late 1960s, impulses in peripheral nerves had been recorded in animal experiments alone using a technique that involved dissection and splitting the nerve. This approach is not tolerable for general use in humans although it has been pursued in one single study. Actually, the concern of nerve damage was a major obstacle for the development of microneurography because the approach of inserting a needle electrode in a human nerve was generally regarded as potentially dangerous and involving substantial risk of permanent nerve damage. The two Swedish scientists who developed the microneuropgraphy technique (Hagbarth and Vallbo) handled the medical-ethical concern by performing a large series of experiments on their own nerves during a period of about 2 years while carefully checking for nerve damage. Working at the Department of Clinical Neurophysiology, Academic Hospital, Uppsala, they collected data resulting in the first papers representing three areas to become major fields of microneurography, i.e. afference from intra-muscular sense organs during voluntary contractions, response of cutaneous sense organs related to touch stimuli, and efferent sympathetic activity controlling the constriction of human blood vessels. The microneurography approach of Hagbarth and Vallbo based on epoxy resin coated tungsten microelectrodes is now generally accepted whereas an alternative attempt using glass coated platina-iridium electrodes had obviously limited success as it yielded a single short note alone.

== Structure of nerves ==
Nerve fibers (axons) of various kinds are more or less randomly mixed in most nerves. This is true for fibers of different functions as well as fibers of different sizes. Basically fiber diameter is closely related to function, e.g. the cutaneous pain system is dependent on small nerve fibers whereas discriminative touch is dependent on large fibers. With regard to fiber diameter there are two main categories: myelinated A-fibers are large and conduct impulses at high or moderate speed (5–75 m/s) while unmyelinated C-fibers are small and conduct impulses at low speed (around 1 m/s). In microneurography recordings, A- and C-fiber impulses differ in shape and polarity of the main upstroke of the action potential. Because fibers are mixed in most nerves, it is usually essential to record from an individual nerve fiber at a time to explore the properties of a functional system, although multi-unit recording has been very rewarding in studies of sympathetic efferent activity. An individual nerve consists of a number of fascicles, i.e. bundles of nerve fibers enclosed within a connective tissue sheath containing the different nerve fibers. Therefore, the tip of the microelectrode needs to be not only intraneural but also intrafascicular for a recording to be possible.

== Methods ==
Microneurography is based on tungsten needle microelectrodes which are inserted through the skin and into a nerve. Anaesthetics are not required because the procedure induces only minimal discomfort. The tungsten microelectrodes have a shaft diameter of 100-200 μm, a tip diameter of 1-5 μm, and they are insulated to the tip with an epoxy resin. Electrode impedance varies between 0.3 and 5 MΩ at 1 kHz as measured initially. However, the impedance tends to decrease during experiment and is usually below 1 MΩ while impulses are recorded. Nerve discharges are determined by voltage differences between the intra-neural electrode and a reference needle electrode in the vicinity. The 2 electrodes are connected to a differential amplifier with a high input impedance and an appropriate band-pass filtering, often 500 to 5000 Hz. Signals are monitored on a computer screen and stored on a hard disc for off-line analysis. Any peripheral nerve that can be reached may be a target for microneurography recordings, typically in the arm or leg, although recording from facial nerves and the vagus nerve have also been achieved. In order to locate deep nerves, electrical stimulation through a needle electrode or ultrasonic monitoring is often used. This is rarely needed when recording from cutaneous superficial nerves, such as the superficial peroneal or superficial radial nerves, that can easily be located visually and by palpation. When electrical localization is needed, weak electrical shocks are delivered either through the recording electrode or through a separate stimulation needle while adjusting the electrode tip until a neural response is observed, either a muscle twitch or a cutaneous sensation reported by the subject. In ultrasonic monitoring, a linear, high frequency ultrasound probe is used. The microelectrode is then inserted 1–2 cm from the probe, ideally in a 90° angle to the ultrasonic beam. This generates the best wave reflection and image. Ultrasonic approach accurately locates the depth of the nerve and identifies surrounding anatomical structures of interest, such as blood vessels and bony structures, which may affect the placement of a microelectrode. A particular advantage is that the ultrasonic approach visualizes the electrode and the nerve at the same time, thereby facilitating electrode manipulation to reach the nerve. Once the electrode tip is in the nerve, small adjustments are required, first, to penetrate the sheath of an individual fascicle and, second, to take the tip close to the nerve fibers of the kind you are interested to explore, be it multi-unit sympathetic activity or single unit activity of either a myelinated afferent or a small unmyelinated fibres.

=== The marking technique ===
Recording of single afferent impulses from C-fibers was greatly improved by the development of the so-called 'marking technique'. This technique is based on a unique property of many kinds of C-fibres, i.e. a decrease of conduction velocity in the wake of preceding impulses. By combining repetitive electrical stimulation and physical stimulation, e.g. mechanical or thermal stimuli, units responding to the physical stimulation will display sudden slowing of their conduction velocity which can be easily visualized in raster plots of latency. This allows identification and characterization of nerve fiber responsiveness to natural stimulation. The marking technique is very efficient as it allows simultaneous recordings of several fibers. However, it generates only semi-quantitative information about unitary activity, whereas recordings of impulse trains allow more comprehensive description of functional properties of sense organs.

=== Micro-stimulation ===
The microneurography electrode may be used not only for recording of nerve impulses but for stimulation of individual fibers as well. An interesting application is to combine successive recording and stimulation of the same afferent. Once the functional properties of an afferent have been defined, e.g. with regard to sensitivity, receptive field structure, and adaptation, the electrode may be reconnected to a stimulator to give trains of electrical pulses of controlled strength, rate, and duration. It has been found that the percept elicited from a single tactile afferent in the glabrous skin of the hand, may be remarkably detailed and closely matching the properties of the afferent, indicating a high degree of specificity. Although this approach to bridge the gap between biophysical events in a single afferent and mental phenomena within the mind is simple and straight forward in principle it is demanding in practice for a number of reasons. Micro-stimulation has also been used to characterize individual motor units with regard to contraction properties.

== Functional systems explored ==
Microneurography recordings have elucidated the organization as well as normal and pathological function of a fair number of neural systems in human. Recently, the technique has also been used in clinical situations for diagnostic purposes to clarify the condition of the individual patient. Three main groups of neural systems have been explored, i.e. proprioception, cutaneous sensibility, and sympathetic efferent activity.

== Proprioception and motor control ==
Information from a variety of sense organs provides information about joint positions and movements. The most elaborate proprioceptive sense organ is the muscle spindle. It is unique because its functional state is continually controlled from the brain through the fusimotor system. Recordings from muscle spindle afferents indicate that the fusimotor system remains largely passive when the parent muscle is relaxed whereas is it regularly activated in voluntary contractions and more so the stronger the contraction. Thus microneurography suggests a parallelism between the two motor systems, i.e. the skeletomotor system controlling the ordinary muscle fibers and the fusimotor system. This seems to hold at least for weak contractions and small movements which have been explored so far. In contrast, more independent fusimotor activity has been reported in animal experiments, mainly cat hind limb, where larger movements are allowed. Thanks to fusimotor activation, the afferent signal from muscle spindles remains efficient in monitoring large changes of muscle length without turning silent during muscle shortening. On the other hand, very small intramuscular events are monitored as well, thanks to the extreme sensitivity of the sense organ. An example is the small pulsatile component of the muscle contraction which is due to a periodic fluctuation at 8–10 Hz of the motor command. These small variations are insentient but readily monitored by the population of spindle afferents. They are akin to the tremor we may experience when emotionally excited. The functional significance of the insentient spindle response to faint intramuscular events remains to be assessed. However, it seems likely that detailed information on large as well as small mechanical events in the muscles is essential for neural systems in the brain to produce appropriate commands for dexterous movements.

Microneurography has demonstrated that our brains make use of detailed proprioceptive information not only by deep sense organs but by cutaneous mechanoreceptors as well. Any joint movement causing the slightest skin stretch is accurately monitored by cutaneous Ruffini endings in the skin area surrounding the joint.

== Cutaneous sensibility ==
Cutaneous sensibility includes a number of functions. Microneurography has been particularly used to investigate discriminative and affective touch mechanisms, as well as pain mechanisms, although afferents related to pruritus and temperature have been studied to some extent as well. A separate set of studies concern motor effects from cutaneous tactile afferents in the glabrous skin.

=== Discriminative touch ===
Two different tactile systems have been identified. A system for discriminative touch has been intensely studied since long whereas a system for affective touch was understood and explored more recently. Discriminative touch is based on large myelinated afferents from skin as well as afferents from deeper structures. This system allows us to extract detailed information on spatial and temporal features of any skin deformation as well as properties of physical objects such as size, shape, and surface structure. The glabrous skin of the human hand has a paramount role in discriminative touch. Thus the tactile organization of this skin area has therefore been extensively explored. Altogether there are about 17,000 tactile afferents in the glabrous skin area of one hand. They are of four distinct types. Two kinds of afferents have small receptive fields suited for high spatial resolution (Merkel and Meissner). They are particularly numerous in the pulp of the finger, a region often engaged in exploration of object properties. Pacini units are extremely sensitive to fast movements whereas spatial resolution is poor. Ruffini units are characterized by high sensitivity to skin stretch and forces acting on the nails. Micro-stimulation has shown that input from one single Meissner, Merkel, or Pacini unit may produce a distinct and differential percept in the mind of the subject indicating an absolute specificity within the tactile system. It has even been demonstrated that a single impulse in a Meissner afferent may produce a percept. In contrast, no percept is reported when a single Ruffini afferent is stimulated which might indicate that spatial summation is required. Consistent with the perceptive findings, neural responses in the somatosensory cortex have been recorded on micro-stimulation of single afferents connected to Meissner, Merkel, Pacini endings but not with single Ruffini afferents. On the basis of collateral studies in man and monkey a very tight match has been claimed between magnitude estimation of sensation of skin deformation, on the one hand, and response of Merkel afferents in the monkey, on the other. In man, deviations from such a linear relation was found in combined psychophysical and microneurography recordings. In the hairy skin Meissner units are lacking altogether. Instead there are hair follicle and field afferents which have large receptive fields while Merkel, Pacini, and Ruffini are present. Cutaneous Ruffini units in the hairy skin are important for position sense and kinesthesia as pointed out in another section. A caveat is justified with regard to end organ morphology. The four kinds of units considered above were physiologically identified in man (FA/RA and SA units, i.e. fast and slowly adapting type I and type II, ) whereas end organ morphology has been inferred on the basis of animal studies. Particularly, it seems likely that SAII afferents may be connected to other morphological structures than the classical Ruffini ending.

=== Affective touch ===
Light touch is coded not only in large myelinated afferents but in small unmyelinated afferents as well. Tactile C-afferents (CT) were described long ago in non-human species but did not attract much interest until it was shown that they are numerous in human hairy skin. In contrast, they are lacking altogether in glabrous skin. A number of findings from both normal subjects and from unique patients lacking large tactile afferents indicate that CT afferents are essential for the pleasurable aspect of friendly touch.

Particularly, CT afferents respond vigorously to slow caressing movements, and, importantly, the size of the afferent response matches the sense of pleasure reported by the subject. fMRI studies of brain activity indicate that CT activate the insular cortex but not the primary or secondary somatosensory cortex consistent with the hypothesis that CT may play a role in emotional, behavioral, and hormonal responses to pleasant skin-to-skin contact between individuals.

=== Tactile afferents in motor control ===
It has been shown that tactile afferents from the glabrous skin of the hand exert profound effects on hand and finger muscles in the subconscious control of grip force whenever we lift and manipulate objects. The friction between skin and object surface is extracted as soon as your fingers close around the object and contraction force of the muscles gripping the object is adjusted accordingly. Moreover, any tendency to slipping is monitored by tactile afferents and gives rise to swift reflexes resulting in subconscious adjustments of motor output. Many forms of dexterous handling of objects include successive phases of different motor activity. It has been shown that tactile sense organs in the glabrous skin are involved in timely linking the separated phases to a purposeful motor act.

=== Pain related afferents ===
Afferents responding to noxious stimuli are known as nociceptors. There are 2 main groups, unmyelinated C afferents and small myelinated Aδ fibers. Most studies are focused on C nociceptors. The nociceptive C-fibers constitute a very large proportion of somatic afferent nerve fibers. There are two main groups: mechano-sensitive and mechano-insensitive C nociceptors. Mechano-sensitive C nociceptors, also known as polymodal C nociceptors are activated by several kinds of stimuli, i.e. mechanical, thermal, and chemical. The mechano-insensitive C nociceptors, also known as silent nociceptors, differ from polymodal afferents in other respects as well, e.g. they do not respond to heat or they have very high heat thresholds, receptive fields on the skin are larger, conduction velocity is slower, and activity-dependent slowing of conduction velocity of the axon is more pronounced. The mechano-insensitive nociceptors may be sensitized particularly by inflammatory mediators to render them mechano-responsive, a process that may account for the tenderness we experience following a physical injury. Moreover, electrical activation of C-mechano-insensitive fibers demonstrates that they have a role in neurogenic vasodilation which has not been found with polymodal nociceptors. It is suspected that the inflammatory mediators bind to protein receptors on mechano-insensitive nociceptors, but sensitization may also be caused by changes in gene expression that affect expression of transduction proteins. In either case, the sensitization of mechano-insensitive nociceptors has been observed to result in hyperalgesia, chronic pain. About ten percent of the afferents classified as mechano-insensitive nociceptors seem to constitute a group of “itch specific” units because they respond to pruritogen substances including histamine with an activity that corresponds to the sensation of itch.

=== Temperature sensibility ===
Thermoreceptors can be separated into two groups for warmth and cold detection. A subset of unmyelinated fibers are responsible for warmth detection. They are mechano-insensitive, low in number, and innervate small receptive fields. Aδ fibers are responsible for cold detection. However, there seems to be a subset of C-fibers that may function as cold-receptors along with A-fibers. Remarkably, these C-cold fibers seem to produce a sensation of unpleasant heat when there is no input from A-fibers. Altogether thermoreceptive afferents have not been studied as much as other systems.

== Autonomic efferent activity ==
Spinal nerve Sympathetic ganglion multilingual

Microneurography exploration of sympathetic efferent system is unique from technical point of view as multiunit recordings have been very prosperous whereas single unit recording is essential with most other systems. Soon after microneurography was launched it was demonstrated that sympathetic activity is much different in muscle and skin nerves. Instantaneous sympathetic activity in muscle nerves (MSA / MSNA) is heavily controlled by baroreflex mechanisms, resulting in a characteristic cardiac rhythmicity as well as a close and inverse relation to the small variations of blood pressure that normally occur continuously in phase with respiration. In contrast, the sympathetic activity in skin nerves (SSA/SSNA) lacks a tight relation to cardiac and respiratory events. On the other hand, sympathetic activity in skin nerves is dependent on a number of other mechanisms because changes are easily evoked e.g. by arousal, emotions, and ambient temperature changes, which stimuli are not effective with efferents in muscle nerves. These and other findings demonstrate that sympathetic efferent activity is highly differentiated, as individual effectors are governed by their own control systems and specific reflexes. The amount of muscular sympathetic activity, measured as number of bursts per 100 heart beats, varies considerably between subjects but, on the other hand, it is highly reproducible over time within the individual subject. However, there is some increase with age. Counter-intuitively, there seems to be only a weak and barely significant correlation between sympathetic efferent activity and hypertension as found in group studies.

In 1998, microneurography recordings were performed for the first time on a spaceflight aboard the Space Shuttle Columbia with the purpose to explore the effect of microgravity on the human sympathetic nerve system. Two astronauts measured MSNA from peroneal nerves of their fellow astronauts. The findings support earlier observations that weightlessness results in a decrease of MSNA activity through a baroreflex mechanism.

== Strengths and limitations ==
The microneurography technique allows the recording of impulse activity of individual nerve fibers with absolute resolution in attending human subjects. Hence the subject is able to cooperate in various kinds of tests while the exact and complete information carried by the individual nerve fiber is monitored and offered for analysis of correlations between neural activity and physical or mental events. On the other hand, the particular physical conditions involving a microelectrode freely floating in the tissue preclude brisk and large movements because the exact electrode position is easily jeopardized. The experiment can be time-consuming when targeting deeply located nerves because the search procedure can be particularly demanding. However, accessing superficial subcutaneous nerves such as the superficial peroneal nerve on the dorsum of the foot is very rapid. This has permitted that the technique that was initially felt to be unsuited as a diagnostic test can now be applied for clinical purposes. Microneurography strength is in its unique power for exploration of normal neural mechanisms as well as pathophysiological conditions of various neurological disorders. Microneurography records intact axons in vivo and is minimally invasive. There have been no reports of persistent nerve damage. As a result, repeated recordings with the same subject are possible and longitudinal observations can be made. The technique has recently been used in clinical trials of new anti-neuropathic pain agents. During the recording, it is important to create an atmosphere of psychological confidence and to observe carefully the subject´s reactions so that the procedure can be adjusted accordingly. The technique requires training and skill and it is highly recommended to take up the method in an experienced laboratory where the method is regularly used.

== See also ==
- Electroneuronography
