= Charles Bance =

French engraver

Charles Bance (27 April 1771 - 20 January 1863) was a French engraver, publisher and print dealer, known as Bance the Younger.

== Life ==
He and Jacques-Louis Bance (1761–1847; known as Bance the Elder) born in Claville to Charles Bance and Marie Anne Grandhomme - both brothers became engravers, publishers and print dealers.

Charles junior set up a print studio on rue Saint-Séverin, not far from Jacques-Louis'. He married Thérèse Firmin. He died at home on rue Portefoin in Paris and is buried at the cimetière du Père-Lachaise.

== Bibliography ==
- (in French) Béatrice Bouvier, La dynastie Bance, marchands d'estampes et libraires à Paris (1793-1862), publication de enssib., 2005.
