= American Journal of Clinical Dermatology =

- Discipline: Dermatology
- Language: English
- Edited by: Christine Noble

Publication details
- History: 2000–present
- Publisher: Springer Nature
- Frequency: Bimonthly
- Impact factor: 8.8 (2024)

Standard abbreviations
- ISO 4: Am. J. Clin. Dermatol.

Indexing
- CODEN: AJCDCI
- ISSN: 1175-0561 (print); 1179-1888 (web)
- OCLC no.: 44773918

Links
- Journal homepage

The American Journal of Clinical Dermatology (Am J Clin Dermatol) is a bimonthly peer-reviewed medical journal published by Springer Nature. The American Journal of Clinical Dermatology promotes evidence-based therapy and effective patient management within the discipline of dermatology by publishing critical and comprehensive review articles and clinically focussed original research articles covering all aspects of the management of dermatological conditions.

The journal is included in Index Medicus (MEDLINE) and EMBASE.

According to the Journal Citation Reports, the journal has a 2024 impact factor of 8.8.
