= ALPK1 =

Protein-coding gene in the species Homo sapiens

Identifiers
- Aliases: ALPK1, 8430410J10Rik, LAK, alpha kinase 1, ROSAH
- External IDs: OMIM: 607347; MGI: 1918731; GeneCards: ALPK1
Enzyme activity
EC #	BRENDA	ExPASy	KEGG	MetaCyc
2.7.11.1	↗	↗	↗	↗

Gene location (Human)
Chr.	Chromosome 4 (human)
Band	4q25	Start	112,285,509 bp
Band	4q25	End	112,442,621 bp

Gene location (Mouse)
Chr.	Chromosome 3 (mouse)
Band	3|3 G2	Start	127,463,959 bp
Band	3|3 G2	End	127,574,176 bp
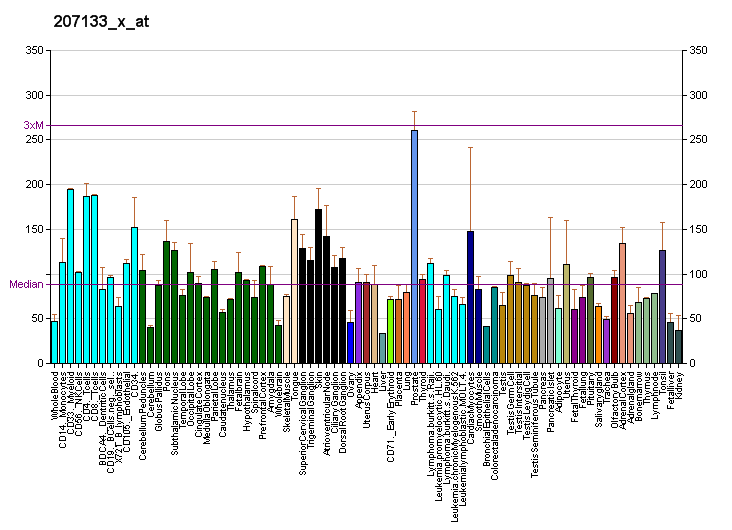
RNA expression pattern
Bgee	Human / Mouse (ortholog); Top expressed in: buccal mucosa cell; tendon of biceps brachii; blood; pancreatic ductal cell; monocyte; Achilles tendon; gastric mucosa; spleen; sural nerve; skin of abdomen / Top expressed in: granulocyte; ventricular zone; spermatid; esophagus; embryo; genital tubercle; dentate gyrus of hippocampal formation granule cell; primary visual cortex; superior frontal gyrus; lip; More reference expression data
BioGPS	More reference expression data
Gene ontology
Molecular function	transferase activity; ATP binding; kinase activity; protein serine/threonine kinase activity; protein binding; monosaccharide binding
Cellular component	cytoplasm; cytosol
Biological process	protein phosphorylation; phosphorylation; immune system process; cytoplasmic pattern recognition receptor signaling pathway; positive regulation of I-kappaB kinase/NF-kappaB signaling; innate immune response
Sources:Amigo / QuickGO
Orthologs
Databases	NCBI: entry; OMA: entry
Species	Human	Mouse
Entrez	80216	71481
Ensembl	ENSG00000073331	ENSMUSG00000028028
UniProt	Q96QP1	Q9CXB8
RefSeq (mRNA)	NM_001102406; NM_001253884; NM_025144	NM_027808
RefSeq (protein)	NP_001095876; NP_001240813; NP_079420	n/a
Location (UCSC)	Chr 4: 112.29 – 112.44 Mb	Chr 3: 127.46 – 127.57 Mb
PubMed search
- Wikidata
View/Edit Human	View/Edit Mouse

Alpha-protein kinase 1 is an enzyme that in humans is encoded by the ALPK1 gene.

Unlike most eukaryotic kinases, alpha kinases, such as LAK, recognize phosphorylation sites in which the surrounding peptides have an alpha-helical conformation.[supplied by OMIM]
