= Miliaria =

Itchy skin rash due to clogged sweat glands

- Other names: Sweat rash, heat rash, prickly heat
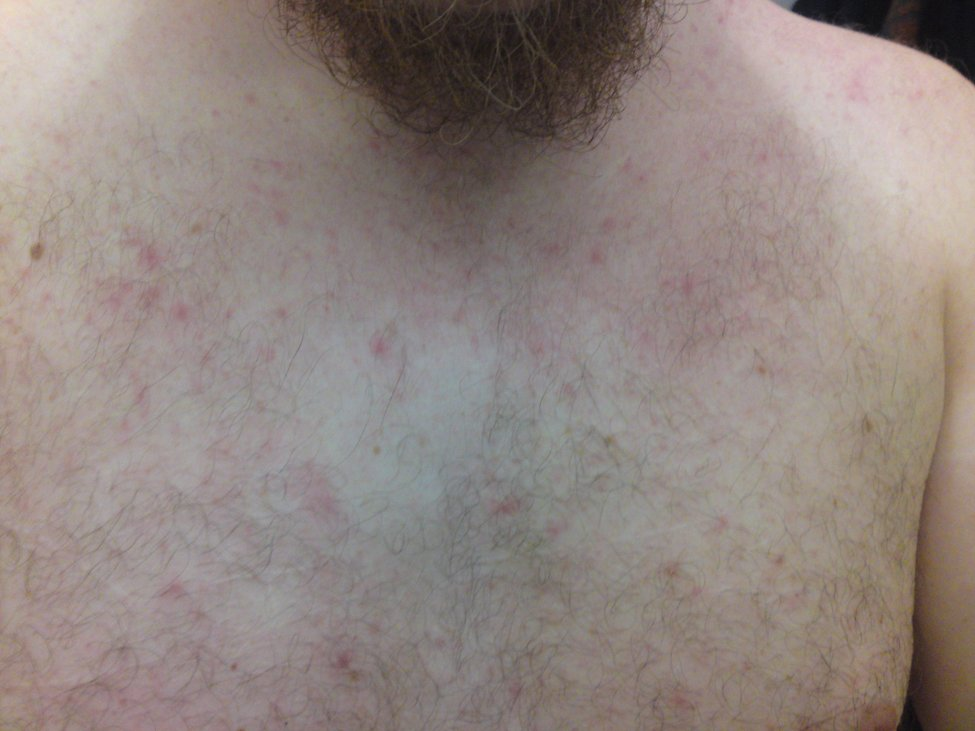
- Typical red spots on chest, neck, and shoulders, caused by miliaria rubra
- Pronunciation: /ˌmɪl.iˈɛər.i.ə/ MIL-ee-AIR-ee-ə
- Specialty: Dermatology

Miliaria, commonly known as heat rash, sweat rash, or prickly heat, is a skin disease marked by small, itchy rashes due to sweat trapped under the skin by clogged sweat-gland ducts. Like sunburn, miliaria is common in hot and humid conditions, such as in the tropics and during the summer. Although it affects people of all ages, it is especially common in children and infants because of their underdeveloped sweat glands.

== Signs and symptoms ==
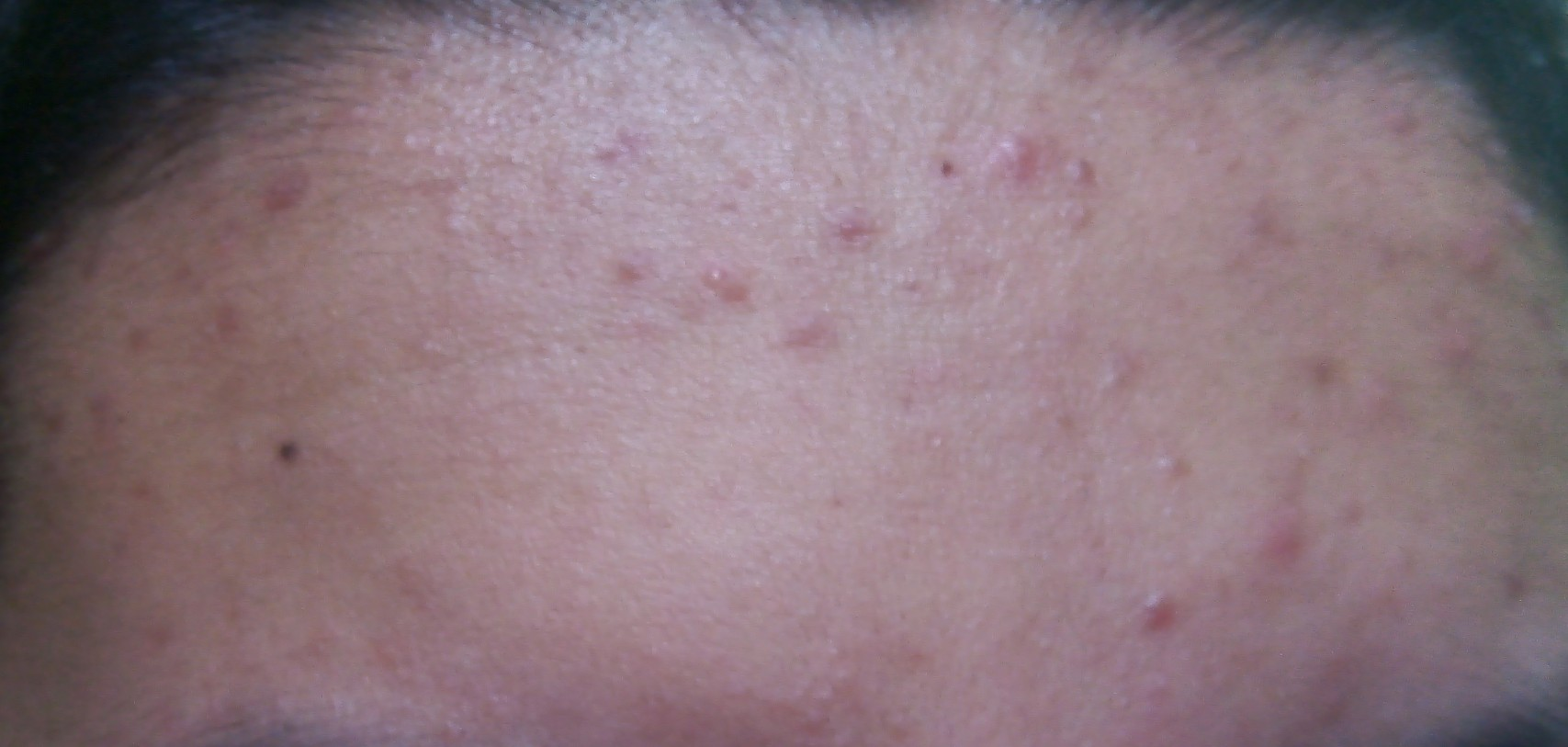
Miliaria rubra in a forehead

Symptoms of miliaria include small, red rashes, called papules, which are irritating and itchy. These may simultaneously occur at a number of areas on a patient's body, the most common including the upper chest, neck, elbow creases, under the breasts, and under the scrotum. Other areas include skin folds and areas of the body that may rub against clothing, such as the back, chest, and stomach.

A related and sometimes simultaneous condition is folliculitis, where hair follicles become plugged with foreign matter, resulting in inflammation.

The symptoms relating to miliaria should not be confused with shingles, as they can be very similar. Shingles is limited to one side of the body, but also has a rash-like appearance. It is also accompanied by a prickly sensation and pain throughout the region. Those who suspect they have shingles and not miliaria should seek medical advice immediately as the sooner antivirals are taken, the better.

== Types ==
Miliaria can be classified according to the top level at which obstruction occurs in the sweat glands.

=== Miliaria crystallina ===
The most superficial obstruction (with the most mild clinical presentation), is known as miliaria crystallina; instead of a rash, the patient presents with multiple, tiny, blister-like lesions that look like beads of perspiration and essentially cause no symptoms. Miliaria crystallina is also known as sudamina or miliaria crystalline. The superficial vesicles are not associated with an inflammatory reaction.

=== Miliaria rubra ===
The most commonly encountered form of the illness is miliaria rubra, in which obstruction causes leakage of sweat into the deeper layers of the epidermis, provoking a local inflammatory reaction and giving rise to the typical appearance of redness (hence rubra) and larger (but still only a few millimetres), blister-like lesions. This form of the illness is often accompanied by the typical symptoms—intense itching or "pins and needles" with a lack of sweating (anhidrosis) to affected areas. A small risk of heat exhaustion exists due to inability to sweat if the rash affects a large proportion of the body's surface area or the patient continues to engage in heat-producing activity. Miliaria rubra is also known as prickly heat and heat rash. Differential diagnosis should be used to rule out polycythemia vera, which is a rare hematological disorder and appears more often in males than females, generally not before the age of 40. Both disorders share a common trait of appearing after taking a hot shower.

=== Miliaria profunda ===
The most severe form of miliaria, miliaria profunda, sometimes referred to as "wildfire" due to the rapid spread and severe burning sensations, generally occurs as a complication of repeated episodes of miliaria rubra. The obstruction is deep in the structure of the sweat gland, causing the gland's secretions to leak between the superficial and deep layers of the skin. The rash and associated symptoms tend to appear within hours of an activity provoking sweating, but similarly fade within hours when the stimulus for the sweating is removed. Miliaria profunda is characterised by nonpruritic, flesh-coloured, deep-seated, whitish papules. The rash tends to be flesh-coloured as opposed to the prominent redness of miliaria rubra, and the risk of heat exhaustion is larger. Miliaria profunda is also less commonly known as "mammillaria"

=== Miliaria pustulosa ===
Miliaria pustulosa describes pustules due to inflammation and bacterial infection. Miliaria pustulosa is preceded by another dermatitis that has produced injury, destruction, or blocking of the sweat ducts.

=== Postmiliarial hypohidrosis ===
Postmiliarial hypohidrosis is a skin condition that results from occlusion of sweat ducts and pores, and may be severe enough to impair an individual's ability to perform sustained work in a hot environment.

=== Tropical anhidrotic asthenia ===
Tropical anhidrotic asthenia is a skin condition, a rare form of miliaria, with long-lasting poral occlusion, which produces anhidrosis and heat retention.

=== Occlusion miliaria ===
Occlusion miliaria is a skin condition that is accompanied by anhidrosis and increased heat-stress susceptibility, all after the application of extensive polyethylene film occlusion for 48 hours or longer.

=== Colloid milium ===
Colloid milium is a skin condition characterized by a translucent, flesh-colored, or slightly yellow, 1 to 5 mm papules.

== Pathophysiology ==
Miliaria occurs when sweat glands become clogged due to dead skin cells or bacteria such as Staphylococcus epidermidis, a common bacterium that occurs on the skin, which is also associated with acne.

The trapped sweat leads to irritation (prickling), itching, and a rash of very small blisters, usually in a localized area of the skin.

== Prevention ==
Prickly heat can be prevented by avoiding activities that induce sweating, using air conditioning to cool the environment, wearing light clothing, and in general, avoiding hot and humid weather. Frequent cool showers or cool baths with mild soap can help to prevent heat rash.

== Treatment ==
The primary remedy for prickly heat or rash is to wear lighter clothing, or otherwise avoid overheating one's body. The immediate treatment of the involved skin areas involves the use of a soothing ointment, such as calamine lotion.

Medical assistance should be sought for the first episode of a rash with the appearance of miliaria. The differential diagnosis includes several conditions that an experienced practitioner should be able to recognise and may require treatment distinct from the usual measures taken for miliaria. In most cases, the rash of miliaria resolves without intervention, but severe cases can last for weeks and cause significant disability. General measures should be recommended for all patients, including moving to an air-conditioned environment if possible, avoiding sweat-provoking activities and occlusive clothing, and taking frequent, cool showers.

The use of topical antibacterials (including antibacterial soaps) may shorten the duration of symptoms in miliaria rubra even in the absence of obvious superinfection. Other topical agents that may reduce the severity of symptoms include anti-itch preparations such as calamine or menthol- or camphor-based preparations, and topical steroid creams. Caution should be used, however, with oil-based preparations (ointments and oily creams as opposed to water-based or aqueous lotions) that may increase blockage of the sweat glands and prolong the duration of illness. Other agents have been investigated including supplemental vitamin A and C and vitamin A based medications, but little scientific evidence supports any of the above treatments in reducing the duration of symptoms or frequency of complications.

In most tropical areas, the local dispensaries sell prickly heat powder, a talc admixture containing drying milk proteins (labilin) and Triclosan to fight bacterial infection. These include cooling menthol to help alleviate difficulty getting to sleep. This is an effective treatment; the powder stays on the skin longer and treats bacteria dispersed into bed linens, providing a reasonably dry refuge area for healing. Miliaria often covers large areas, and generous use of cortisone may be contraindicated for reasons stated on package warnings. Regular talcum powder does not reduce the rash, but can alleviate burning and itching. In cases where the rash has developed into open blisters or pustular lesions, a doctor should be consulted since more aggressive, medically monitored treatment may be required.

== See also ==
- Cholinergic urticaria
- Sweat allergy
