= Hypohidrosis =

Abnormally reduced sweating

- Other names: Anhidrosis
- Specialty: Dermatology, neurology
- Complications: hyperthermia, heat stroke, and death

Hypohidrosis is a medical condition in which a person exhibits diminished sweating in response to appropriate stimuli. In contrast with hyperhidrosis, which is a socially troubling yet often harmless condition, the consequences of untreated hypohidrosis include hyperthermia, heat stroke and death. An extreme case of hypohidrosis in which there is a complete absence of sweating and the skin is dry is termed anhidrosis. The condition is also known as adiaphoresis, ischidrosis, oligidria, oligohidrosis and sweating deficiency.

== Causes ==
Causes include:

Medications
- Anticholinergic agents
- Opioids
- Botulinum toxin
- Alpha-2 receptor antagonists
- Clonidine
- Barbiturates
- Zonisamide
- Topiramate

Physical agents

- Tumors
- Burns
- Radiation
- Surgery
- Scars
- Sores

Dermatological

- X-linked hypohidrotic ectodermal dysplasia
- Incontinentia pigmenti
- Acrokeratosis paraneoplastica of Bazex
- Ectodermal dysplasia
- Fabry disease
- Miliaria
- Sjögren syndrome
- Systemic sclerosis
- Graft-versus-host disease

Neuropathic

- Ectodermal dysplasia
- Multiple system atrophy
- Dementia with Lewy bodies
- Multiple sclerosis
- Cerebrovascular accident
- Tumour
- Encephalitis
- Cervical myelopathy
- Diabetes mellitus
- Guillain–Barré syndrome
- Hereditary sensory and autonomic neuropathy
- Alcoholism
- Amyloidosis
- Ross syndrome
- Pure autonomic failure
- Horner's syndrome
- ROSAH syndrome

== Diagnosis ==
Sweat is readily visualized by a topical indicator such as iodinated starch (Minor test) or sodium alizarin sulphonate, both of which undergo a dramatic colour change when moistened by sweat. A thermoregulatory sweat test can evaluate the body’s response to a thermal stimulus by inducing sweating through a hot box (also called a hot room), a thermal blanket, or physical exercise. Failure of the topical indicator to undergo a colour change during thermoregulatory sweat testing indicates hypohidrosis, and further tests may be required to localize the lesion.

Magnetic resonance imaging of the brain and/or spinal cord is the best modality for evaluation when the lesion is suspected to be localized to the central nervous system.

Skin biopsies are useful when anhidrosis occurs as part of a dermatological disorder. Biopsy results may reveal the sweat gland destruction, necrosis or fibrosis, in addition to the findings of the primary dermatological disorder.

== Treatment ==
The treatment options for hypohidrosis and anhidrosis are largely limited to preventing overheating and attempting to resolve or prevent further deterioration of any known underlying causes.

Those with hypohidrosis should avoid drugs that can aggravate the condition (see "Medications", under § Causes). They should limit activities that raise the core body temperature and if exercises are to be performed, they should be supervised and be performed in a cool, sheltered, and well-ventilated environment.

When the cause is known, treatment should be directed at the primary pathology. In autoimmune diseases, such as Sjögren syndrome and systemic sclerosis, treatment of the underlying disease using immunosuppressive drugs may lead to improvement in hypohidrosis. In neurological diseases, the primary pathology is often irreversible. In these instances, prevention of further neurological damage, such as good glycaemic control in diabetes, is the cornerstone of management. In acquired generalized anhidrosis, spontaneous remission may be observed in some cases. Corticosteroid pulse therapy has increased sweating in some people.

== In other animals ==
Horses can also have hypohidrosis. Management includes avoiding exercise in warm weather and using water or other cooling devices. Horses may have inflammation of the airway, which may reduce the horse's ability to use panting as a form of thermoregulation.

== Sources ==
- Demis, D.J. (1994). Clinical Dermatology. J.B. Lippincott. ISBN 978-0-397-57250-2.

== General references ==
- http://www.mayoclinic.com/health/anhidrosis/DS01050
- MedlinePlus Encyclopedia: Sweating - absent

== See also ==
- Horner's syndrome
- Hyperhidrosis (excessive sweating)
- Congenital insensitivity to pain with anhidrosis
- Fabry's disease
- Ross' syndrome
- Generalized anhidrosis
