= List of allergens =

This is a list of allergies, which includes the allergen, potential reactions, and a brief description of the cause where applicable.

An allergy is a misguided type-I hypersensitivity response triggered by binding of an allergen to immunoglobulin E (IgE) antibodies. Antibody reactions require a molecule of sufficient size. As a result, most allergens are large biomolecules such as proteins and carbohydrates, many of which can be removed or broken down by food processing. A smaller molecule may still become allergenic by binding to a larger molecule to form an epitope of sufficient size; such a small molecule is called a hapten.

This list also includes some other forms of hypersensitivity reactions, especially so-called allergic contact dermatitis (ACD), a type-IV hypersensitivity response. Such a response is not associated with IgE action, but T-cell activation. The prototypic example is Urushiol-induced contact dermatitis.

Allergens are categorized on this page by origin for minimal redundancy. Symptoms typically depend on route of exposure, which is not yet sorted cleanly here.

The World Health Organization and International Union of Immunological Societies (WHO/IUIS) Allergen Nomenclature Sub-Committee maintains a webpage listing every protein (as well as some carbohydrates) that have elicited a confirmed IgE reaction in any human. Readers seeking a more reliable list are advised to visit their website.

== Plant ==
=== Balsam of Peru ===
Routes
Oral (food), Skin contact
Symptoms
Redness, swelling, itching, allergic contact dermatitis reactions, stomatitis (inflammation and soreness of the mouth or tongue), cheilitis (inflammation, rash, or painful erosion of the lips, oropharyngeal mucosa, or angles of their mouth), pruritus, hand eczema, generalized or resistant plantar dermatitis, rhinitis, conjunctivitis, and blisters.

Present in many foods, such as coffee, flavored tea, wine, beer, gin, liqueurs, apéritifs (e.g. vermouth, bitters), soft drinks including cola, juice, citrus, citrus fruit peel, marmalade, tomatoes and tomato-containing products, Mexican and Italian foods with red sauces, ketchup, spices (e.g. cloves, Jamaica pepper (allspice), cinnamon, nutmeg, paprika, curry, anise, and ginger), chili sauce, barbecue sauce, chutney, pickles, pickled vegetables, chocolate, vanilla, baked goods and pastries, pudding, ice cream, chewing gum, and candy.

Present in many drugs, such as hemorrhoid suppositories and ointment (e.g. Anusol), cough medicine/suppressant and lozenges, diaper rash ointments, oral and lip ointments, tincture of benzoin, wound spray (it has been reported to inhibit Mycobacterium tuberculosis as well as the common ulcer-causing bacteria H. pylori in test-tube studies), calamine lotion, surgical dressings, dental cement, eugenol used by dentists, some periodontal impression materials, and in the treatment of dry socket in dentistry.

A number of national and international surveys have identified Balsam of Peru as being in the "top five" allergens causing patch test reactions in people referred to dermatology clinics.

=== Buckwheat ===
Routes
Oral (food), Nasal (inhalation)
Symptoms
Asthma, rhinitis, pruritus, gastrointestinal disturbances, urticaria, angioedema, shock, anaphylaxis

Allergenicity is highest in Japan and Korea. It is estimated that buckwheat causes 5% of all immediate-type allergic reaction cases (from food) in Japan. Hazard extends to inhalation of milled flour particles (aeroallergen). Irrespective of the nomenclature, it is not a wheaten cereal; the name refers to its viability as a pseudocereal. Relating or conflating buckwheat allergy with wheat allergy or Triticeae hypersensitivities should be avoided.

=== Celery ===
Routes
Oral (food)
Symptoms
Abdominal pain, nausea, vomiting, oral allergy syndrome, urticaria, neck or facial swelling, severe asthma symptoms, exercise induced anaphylaxis, potentially fatal anaphylactic shocks

Higher risk of provoking life-threatening reactions compared to most other food allergies. Celery seeds and celeriac are more allergenic than celery stalks. Some individuals become cross-sensitized to other spices and herbs in the parsley family. Prevalence is high among adults in Central Europe. It is estimated that two-fifths of all Swiss food-allergy patients react to celery tubers and nearly a third of severe food allergy reactions in France may be due to celery.

=== Fruit ===
Routes
Oral (food)
Symptoms
Mild itching, rash, generalized urticaria, oral allergy syndrome, abdominal pain, vomiting, anaphylaxis

A wide range of fruits may cause allergy. Mango, strawberries, banana, avocado, and kiwi are common problems. Severe allergies to tomatoes have also been reported. Some cross-react with latex allergy.

Stone fruits are highly cross-reactive with one another, as are the rosaceae fruits

Reaction to hot peppers, a kind of botanical berry, is another specific type of fruit allergy.

=== Garlic ===
Routes
Oral (food)
Symptoms
Dermatitis, rhinitis, asthma, urticaria, asymmetrical pattern of fissure, thickening/shedding of the outer skin layers, rarely anaphylaxis

Very few garlic allergens have been reported, and garlic allergy has been rarely studied. Some garlic-allergic individuals may cross-react with leek, shallot and onion (other Allium). Garlic that has been heated/cooked is less allergenic than raw garlic.

=== Oat ===
Routes
Oral (food), inhalation
Symptoms
Dermatitis, respiratory problems, anaphylaxis

Risk extends to respiratory inhalation. Oat is not a triticeae cereal but it is possible for individuals with gluten-related disorders to be misdiagnosed as having a hypersensitivity to pure oat because cross-contamination is very common in the western world.

=== Wheat (and other cereals) ===
Routes
Oral (food), inhalation
Symptoms
Eczema (atopic dermatitis), Hives, asthma, "baker's asthma", hay fever, oral allergy syndrome, angioedema, abdominal cramps, Celiac disease, diarrhea, temporary (3 or 4 day) mental incompetence, anemia, nausea, vomiting and exercise induced anaphylaxis
Chemical nature
Protein

Risk extends to wheat hybrids like triticale. True wheat allergies are very rare; it is estimated to effect 0.1%-2.2% of individuals depending on region. The allergy does not commonly persist into adolescence. Gluten-free foods are safer for wheat allergic patients but they still may theoretically contain wheat's other allergenic proteins. Wheat allergy symptoms should not be confused with celiac disease, gluten ataxia or non-celiac gluten sensitivity (NCGS). While wheat allergies are "true" allergies, celiac disease and gluten ataxia are an autoimmune diseases. NCGS is more similar to food intolerances but as of 2021 its pathogenesis is still not well understood.

=== Legumes ===
Chemical nature
Seed "storage proteins"

==== Peanut ====
Routes
Oral (food), inhalation
Symptoms
Anaphylaxis and swelling, sometimes vomiting

Distinct from tree nut allergy, as peanuts are legumes. Reactions are often severe or fatal.

Includes some cold-pressed peanut oils. Highly refined (hot pressed followed by further treatment) peanut oils contain almost no protein and present minimal risk.

==== Soy ====
Routes
Oral (food), inhalation
Symptoms
Anaphylaxis, asthma exacerbation, rhinitis, allergic conjunctivitis, hives, atopic dermatitis, swelling of, or under the dermis, diarrhea, nausea, vomiting

Overall is lower in prevalence than both peanut allergy and cow's milk allergy. However, due to similar protein structures, soya is a common cross-reactive allergen in both peanut-allergic individuals and milk-allergic individuals; especially infants.

Again, highly-refined oil is not allergenic.

=== Maize ===
Routes
Oral (food), inhalation
Symptoms
Hives, pallor, confusion, dizziness, stomach pain, swelling, vomiting, indigestion, diarrhea, cough, tightness in throat, wheezing, shortness of breath, anaphylaxis

Often a difficult allergy to manage due to the various food products which contain various forms of maize protein.

=== Mustard seed ===
Routes
Oral (food), inhalation
Symptoms
Eczema, Rash, Hives, Facial swelling, Other skin reactions, Oral allergy syndrome, Conjunctivitis, Wheezing, Abdominal pain, Diarrhea, Nausea, Vomiting, Acid Reflux, Dizziness, Asthma, Chest pain, Respiratory problems, Anaphylaxis

Mustard allergy onset is usually in infancy or toddlerhood; it is seemingly very rare but true prevalence can not be established due to several tests producing high rates of false positives. Due to a gradual increase in prevalence and the severity of known reactions it became recognized as the 11th priority allergen by Canada in 2009, and a top 14 priority allergen by the European Union in 2014.

=== Rice ===
Routes
Oral (food), inhalation
Symptoms
Sneezing, runny nose, itching, stomachache, eczema.

=== Sesame ===
Routes
Oral (food), skin, inhalation
Symptoms
Potentially systemic anaphylactic responses.

By law, foods containing sesame must be labeled so in European Union, Canada, Australia, and New Zealand. Increasing prevalence has led to it being deemed the ninth most common food allergen in the United States in 2019. Highest prevalence by age was among 18-29 year olds and an estimated 80% of all sesame-allergic patients had a comorbid food allergy. In 2018, the US FDA issued a request for information for the consideration of labeling for sesame to help protect people who have sesame allergies. A decision was reached in November 2020 that food manufacturers voluntarily declare that when powdered sesame seeds are used as a previously unspecified spice or flavor, the label be changed to "spice (sesame)" or "flavor (sesame)". Via congressional act, it was declared that food manufacturers must acknowledge sesame as a priority food allergen by the 2023 deadline.

=== Tree nut ===
Routes
Oral (food), inhalation, skin
Symptoms
Anaphylaxis, swelling, rash, hives, sometimes vomiting

Hazard extends to exposure to cooking vapors, or handling. Distinct from peanut allergy, as peanuts are legumes.

=== Pollen ===
Routes
Inhalation, eye contact
Symptoms
Sneezing, body ache, headache (in rare cases, extremely painful cluster headaches may occur due to allergic sinusitis; these may leave a temporary time period of 1 and a half to 2 days with eye sensitivity), allergic conjunctivitis (includes watery, red, swelled, itchy, and irritating eyes), runny nose, irritation of the nose, nasal congestion, minor fatigue, chest pain and discomfort, coughing, sore throat, facial discomfort (feeling of stuffed face) due to allergic sinusitis, possible asthma attack, wheezing

=== Latex ===
Routes
Skin contact, mucousal contact
Symptoms
Contact dermatitis, hypersensitivity

Risk factors for reaction to latex include spina bifida, family history of allergy to latex, or a personal history of allergies, asthma, or eczema.

=== Urushiol ===
Routes
Skin contact
Symptoms
Contact dermatitis

One of the most common allergies. Urushiol is found in various plants, most notably plants in the Toxicodendron genus, such as poison oak and poison ivy.

== Animal ==
=== Egg (chicken, birds) ===
Routes
Oral (food)
Symptoms
Anaphylaxis, swelling, sometimes flatulence and vomiting

Egg yolk and egg white contain different proteins. An allergic individual may not have any reaction to consuming food only prepared with egg yolk and not egg white, or vice versa. Due to high protein content, egg white allergy is more common than the reverse. The majority of children with this allergy become tolerant by adulthood.

=== Fish ===
Routes
Oral (food)
Symptoms
Respiratory reactions, Anaphylaxis, oral allergy syndrome, sometimes vomiting

One of three allergies to seafood, not to be conflated with allergies to crustaceans and mollusks. People with fish allergies have a 50% likelihood of being cross reactive with another fish species, but some individuals are only allergic to one species, such as; tilapia salmon, or cod. A proper diagnosis is considered complicated due to these cross reactivity between fish species and other seafood allergies. Hazard extends to exposure to cooking vapors or handling.

=== Milk ===
Routes
Oral (food)
Symptoms
Skin rash, hives, vomiting, diarrhea, constipation, stomach pain, flatulence, colitis, nasal congestion, dermatitis, blisters, migraine, anaphylaxis

Protein allergy, not to be confused with lactose intolerance. Allergy to cow's milk is the most common food allergy in infants and young children but most outgrow the allergy in early childhood. Introducing baked cow's milk to allergic patients is associated with accelerated resolution of milk allergy. Some evidence suggests goat's milk has less allergenic potential than cow's milk and reduced risk of allergy development if infants are weaned with goat's milk. Due to adult-onset sensitization it is estimated to be the second most common food allergy in American adults.

=== Poultry meat ===
Routes
Oral (food)
Symptoms
Hives, swelling of, or under the dermis, nausea, vomiting, diarrhea, severe oral allergy syndrome, shortness of breath, rarely anaphylactic shock

Very rare allergies to chicken, turkey, squab, and sometimes more mildly to other avian meats. Not to be confused with secondary reactions of bird-egg syndrome. The genuine allergy has no causal relationship with egg allergy, nor is there any close association with red meat allergy. Prevalence still unknown as of 2016.

=== Red meat ===
Routes
Oral (food)
Symptoms
Hives, swelling, dermatitis, stomach pain, nausea, vomiting, dizziness, fainting, shortness of breath, anaphylaxis

Allergies to the sugar carbohydrate found in beef, venison, lamb, and pork called alpha-gal. This carbohydrate is made by almost all mammals, with the notable exception of old world monkeys and apes (including humans). Tick bites may inject this substance into the bloodstream; combined with other defense mechanisms against tick bites, this causes the human body to flag alpha-gal as a foreign antigen.

Allergic reaction to pork is an exception, as it may also be caused by pork-cat syndrome instead of alpha-gal allergy.

=== Shellfish ===
Routes
Oral (food), inhalation
Symptoms
Respiratory symptoms, Anaphylaxis, oral allergy syndrome, gastrointestinal symptoms, rhinitis, conjunctivitis

Shellfish allergies are highly cross reactive. Its prevalence is much higher than that of fish allergy. Shellfish allergy is the leading cause of food allergy in U.S adults. As of 2018 six allergens have been identified to prawn alone; along with crab, it is the major culprit of seafood anaphylaxis. In reference to it as one of the "Big 8" or "major 14" allergens it is sometimes specified as a "crustacean shellfish" allergy, or more simply, a "crustacean allergy". Sometimes it is conflated with an allergy to molluscan shellfish but complete tolerance to one but not the other is not uncommon. Most usually, a mono-sensitive individual will experience a crustacean allergy alone with tolerance to mollusks, rather than vice versa.

The symptoms of an allergic reaction to molluscan shellfish should not be confused with the effects of shellfish poisoning which are a medical reactions that manifest after eating contaminated mollusks from certain areas of the world and lasts for several hours or days after onset.

=== Insect sting ===
Routes
Skin (injection)
Symptoms
Hives, wheezing, possible anaphylaxis

Possible from bee or wasp stings, or bites from mosquitoes or flies like Leptoconops torrens.

=== Dust mite ===
Routes
Skin, inhalation
Symptoms
Asthma

Home allergen reduction may be recommended

=== Cat ===
Routes
Inhalation
Symptoms
Sneezing, itchy swollen eyes, rash, congestion, wheezing

Cats express a number of protein allergens, numbered Fel d 1 to Fel d 7. Fel d 1 (from saliva, licked onto fur) and Fel d 4 are the most common culprits. Fel d 1 causes allergy in 90% of people with cat allergy, while Fel d 4 is responsible for sensitizing around 63% of individuals with cat allergies.

=== Dog ===
Routes
Inhalation
Symptoms
Rash, sneezing, congestion, wheezing, vomiting from coughing, Sometimes itchy welts.

Caused by dander, saliva or urine of dogs, or by dust, pollen or other allergens that have been carried on the fur. Allergy to dogs is present in as much as 10 percent of the population. Dogs express a number of protein allergens: Can f 1, 2, 4, 6. Can f 1 is the major allergen – it causes allergy in 50% to 90% patients with dog allergy. It is produced in the tongue and is present in saliva.

=== Human ===
==== Semen ====
Routes
Oral, skin contact, vaginal contact, eye contact
Symptoms
Burning, pain and swelling, possibly for days, swelling or blisters, vaginal redness, fever, runny nose, extreme fatigue

In a case study in Switzerland, a woman who was allergic to Balsam of Peru was allergic to her boyfriend's semen following intercourse, after he drank large amounts of Coca-Cola.

== Small organic molecules ==
=== Tartrazine ===
Routes
Oral (food), inhalation
Symptoms
Skin irritation, hives, rash

A synthetic food dye used in processed foods like confections, soft drinks, flavoring syrups, condiments and convenience foods in order to create a potent yellow or bright green coloring. Prevalence of allergenicity is unclear but it is the most likely azo dye to cause hypersensitivity and reactions may occur from ingestion or skin contact. It is possible for some individuals to become desensitized. There is no strong evidence suggesting that tartrazine can cause hypersensitivity or intolerance in non-allergic individuals.

=== Dimethylaminopropylamine ===
Routes
Eyelid contact
Symptoms
Eyelid dermatitis

Present as unreacted residue within cocamidopropyl betaine, a mild detergent and foam booster used in liquid soaps and shampoos.

=== Paraphenylenediamine ===
Sources
Black hair dye, Color developer, Scuba gear, Henna (may be added to henna but is not found in pure henna)
Cross-reactions
Para-aminobenzoic acid (PABA), Azo dyes, Sulfonamides, Sulfonylureas, Thiazides, Ester anesthetics

=== Formaldehyde ===
Sources
Present as unreacted residue in various resins, e.g. tosylamide/formaldehyde resin in nail polish and p-tert-butylphenol-formaldehyde resin (PTBP-FR) in craft glues and commercial leather and rubber products
Symptoms
When exposed to eyelid: eyelid dermatitis
When exposed to foot: Foot dermatitis

=== Glyceryl monothioglycolate ===
Sources
Permanent hair waving solutions
Routes
Contact with integumentary system.

=== Tetracycline ===
Routes
Oral, injection
Symptoms
Many, including: severe headache, dizziness, blurred vision, fever, chills, body aches, flu symptoms, severe blistering, peeling, dark colored urine

=== Dilantin ===
Routes
Oral, injection
Symptoms
Many, including: swollen glands, easy bruising or bleeding, fever, sore throat

=== Carbamazepine ===
Routes
Oral
Symptoms
Shortness of breath, wheezing or difficulty breathing, swelling of the face, lips, tongue etc., hives

Also known as brand name "Tegretol".

=== β-lactams ===
==== Penicillin ====
Routes
Oral, injection, skin contact
Symptoms
Diarrhea, hypersensitivity, nausea, rash, neurotoxicity, urticaria

Although as many as 6–10% of the population are labelled as having a penicillin allergy, re-testing show that 90–95% of people labelled as such are actually not allergic. Re-testing and delabelling initiatives allow these patients to use penicillin instead of a higher-risk antibiotic.

==== Cephalosporins ====
Routes
Oral, injection, skin contact
Symptoms
Maculopapular or morbilliform skin eruption, and less commonly urticaria, eosinophilia, serum-sickness–like reactions, and anaphylaxis.

Rarer than penicillin allergy. Some cross-reaction due to molecular similarity.

=== Sulfonamides ===
Routes
Oral, injection, skin contact
Symptoms
Urinary tract disorders, haemopoietic disorders, porphyria and hypersensitivity reactions, Stevens–Johnson syndrome toxic epidermal necrolysis

The first broadly effective antibacterials to be used systemically. About 3% of the population are reported as allergic.

Two regions of the sulfonamide antibiotic chemical structure are implicated in the hypersensitivity reactions associated with the class.

- The first is the N1 heterocyclic ring, which causes a type I hypersensitivity (true allergy) reaction.
- The second is the N4 amino nitrogen that, in a stereospecific process, forms reactive metabolites that cause either direct cytotoxicity or immunologic response.

The nonantibiotic sulfonamides lack both of these structures.

=== NSAIDs ===
Non-steroidal anti-inflammatories (Ibuprofen, Aspirin, etc.)

Symptoms
Many, including: swollen eyes, lips, or tongue, difficulty swallowing, shortness of breath, rapid heart rate

=== Radiocontrast ===
Routes
Intervenous injection
Symptoms
Anaphylactoid reactions and contrast-induced nephropathy (the latter is not related to allergy)

=== Local anesthetics ===
Symptoms
Urticaria and rash, dyspnea, wheezing, flushing, cyanosis, tachycardia

== Small inorganic molecules ==
=== Sulfite ===
Routes
Oral (food)
Symptoms
Hives, rash, redness of skin, headache (particular frontal), burning behind eyes, asthma-like breathing difficulties, anaphylaxis

Sulfites (also spelled "sulphites") are used as a preserving agents in many different foods, such as raisins, dried peaches, various other dried fruit, canned or frozen fruits and vegetables, wines, vinegars and processed meats. Allergy appears to be very rare in the general population but it is still often considered to be one of the top 10 food allergies. It is debated whether reaction to sulfites is a true allergy.

=== Water ===
Symptoms
Epidermal itching, swelling of the oral cavity after drinking water, anaphylaxis (in severe cases)

Strictly aquagenic pruritus or aquagenic urticaria, but cold water may also cause cold urticaria

=== Metals ===
The following metal products may cause allergic contact dermatitis:

- Nickel (nickel sulfate hexahydrate), also may cause dyshidrotic eczema
- Gold (gold sodium thiosulfate)
- Chromium
- Cobalt chloride

== Vaguely-defined artificial mixtures ==
These are man-made mixtures of no defined formula or method of production.

=== Perfume ===
Symptoms
Itchy eyes, runny nose, sore throat, headaches, muscle/joint pain, asthma attack, wheezing, chest pain, blisters

=== Cosmetics ===
Routes
Skin contact, eye contact
Symptoms
Contact dermatitis, irritant contact dermatitis, inflammation, redness, conjunctivitis, sneezing

=== Other vaguely-defined allergens ===
- Photographic developers
- Fungicide

== Non-chemical ==
=== Cold stimuli ===
Symptoms
Hives, itching

== See also ==
- Allergen of the Year
- Allergic inflammation
- Elimination diet
- Food intolerance
- Oral allergy syndrome
- Sweat allergy
- List of inclusion bodies that aid in diagnosis of cutaneous conditions
- List of cutaneous conditions
- List of genes mutated in cutaneous conditions
- List of target antigens in pemphigus
- List of specialized glands within the human integumentary system
