= Water allergy =

Water allergy is a popular name for some diseases where the skin becomes sensitive to contact with water, such as:

- Aquagenic pruritus
- Aquagenic urticaria
