= Adrenergic urticaria =

- Specialty: Dermatology

Adrenergic urticaria is a skin condition characterized by an eruption consisting of small (1-5mm) red macules and papules with a pale halo, appearing within 10 to 15 min after emotional upset. There have been 10 cases described in medical literature, and involve a trigger (coffee, intense emotions) followed by a rise in catecholamine and IgE. Treatment involves propranolol and trigger avoidance.

== Mechanism ==
The underlying mechanisms are not fully understood, but existing research suggests that adrenergic urticaria is linked with elevated serum catecholamine levels. The characteristic halo hives are most likely caused by catecholamine-induced peripheral vasoconstriction around erythematous wheals, which is consistent with other types of urticaria.

== Diagnosis ==
The diagnosis of AU can be made either clinically or by giving an intradermal injection of adrenaline or noradrenaline, which causes the rash, or by monitoring the body's reaction to propranolol, which suppresses the rash and prevents further exacerbations. To avoid excessive vasoconstriction, highly diluted solutions must be used. Skin biopsy specimens of adrenergic urticaria show edematous tissues with a vague inflammatory infiltrate, and electron microscopy reveals mast cell degranulation, supporting the currently accepted theory that mast cells regulate pathogenesis.

== Treatment ==
Most guidelines do not even mention this subtype of urticaria, let alone provide guidance on its management. Based on cases, beta-blocker therapy may offer a rapid-acting, well-tolerated, and effective treatment option for patients.

== See also ==
- Aquagenic urticaria
- Urticaria
- Skin lesion
- List of cutaneous conditions
