= Eyelid dermatitis =

Medical condition

Eyelid dermatitis is commonly related to atopic dermatitis or allergic contact dermatitis. Volatile substances, tosylamide/formaldehyde resin, epoxy hardeners, insect repellent sprays, and lemon peel oil may be implicated, with many cases of eyelid contact dermatitis being caused by substances transferred by the hands to the eyelids.

== Signs and symptoms ==
Dermatitis on the eyelids causes inflammation of the thin, sensitive skin around the eyes. The eyelids become irritated, swollen, dry, and reddened. It can affect one or both of the eyes. If this condition continues, the eyelids can be thickened by lichenification. If it is caused by an irritant or allergen, symptoms typically occur within a few hours or days of contact with a trigger substance. Symptoms should decrease when the trigger substance is removed.

== Types ==
There are two common forms of eyelid dermatitis. Allergic contact dermatitis develops because of an allergic reaction that causes inflammation of the skin, such as pollen in a person with hay fever. Some cosmetic products or metals, such as nickel, are common causes of allergic skin reactions. Irritant contact dermatitis is caused by the eyelid coming into direct contact with a substance that damages the outer layer of the skin, such as certain types of makeup, soaps, and detergents. Other forms of dermatitis on the eyelids include atopic dermatitis is a form of eczema that can affect the eyelids, and seborrheic dermatitis which is a common condition that causes the skin to become inflamed and flakey. Seborrheic dermatitis often occurs on the scalp but can also affect oily areas of skin, such as the eyelids.

== Causes, risks, and complications ==
Allergens commonly causing allergic eyelid dermatitis consisted of fragrances, metals, neomycin, oleamidopropyl dimethylamine, tosylamide/formaldehyde resin, benzalkonium chloride, and other preservatives. Irritants for eyelid contact dermatitis include soaps and detergents, acids and alkalis, chemicals such as chlorine, dust particles, hydrophobic substances, and cosmetics such as eyeliner, eye shadow, mascara and sunscreen. These substances may touch the eyelids directly or be transferred from the fingers. Common items that are irritants and allergens include certain makeup brands, sunscreens, perfumes, swimming goggles, eye drops, false eyelashes, contact lens solution, and airborne particles. Age (infants are more susceptible), genetics, and poor hygiene of the skin are risk factors for eyelid dermatitis. Other risk factors include professions that expose you to an allergen, medications (neomycin, beta blocker) or preservatives such as benzalkonium chloride, and other medical conditions such as asthma, hay fever, acne, psoriasis). Possible complications include skin infection, eye infection, and insomnia.

== Prevention and treatment ==
Some ways to prevent eyelid dermatitis include avoiding scratching or rubbing the eyes, which may cause further inflammation and damage. Avoiding certain foods, moisturizers that contain triggers, wearing protective gear when necessary, moisturizing the area, using less makeup, and spending less time in the shower/using milder soaps and shampoos, are all effective ways to prevent a flare up of eyelid dermatitis.

The best way to stop eyelid dermatitis is to find the trigger and remove it. However, there are several other ways to reduce the symptoms of eyelid dermatitis. Moisturizing the area to prevent excess scratching or itching is beneficial. Corticosteroids can be directly applied to the eyelid as cream to reduce dryness and inflammation. Another option is calcineurin inhibitors, which can be applied as a cream or orally. However, this should be lightly used because it may suppress immune function.

== See also ==
- Skin lesion
