= Oral allergy syndrome =

Medical condition

Oral allergy syndrome (Pollen-Food Allergy)
- Specialty: Immunology

Oral allergy syndrome (OAS) or pollen-food allergy syndrome (PFAS) is a type of allergy classified by a cluster of allergic reactions in the mouth and throat in response to eating certain (usually fresh) fruits, nuts, and vegetables. It typically develops in adults with hay fever. It is usually not serious.

OAS is a class II allergy where the body's immune system produces IgE antibodies against pollen; in OAS, these antibodies also bind to (or cross-react with) other structurally similar proteins found in botanically related plants. Therefore, OAS is only seen in people with seasonal pollen allergies, and mostly people who are allergic to tree pollen. It is usually limited to ingestion of uncooked fruits or vegetables. This differs from a class I food allergy where sensitisation to the protein occurs in the gastrointestinal tract, and is produced as a result of exposure to the food itself.

In adults, up to 60% of all food allergic reactions are due to cross-reactions between foods and inhalative allergens. OAS can occur any time of the year, but is most prevalent during the pollen season. Individuals with OAS usually develop symptoms within minutes of eating the food.

== Signs and symptoms ==
Individuals with OAS may have any of a number of allergic reactions that usually occur very rapidly, within minutes of eating a trigger food. The most common reaction is an itching or burning sensation in the lips, mouth, ear canal, or pharynx. Sometimes other reactions can be triggered in the eyes, nose, and skin. Swelling of the lips, tongue, and uvula, and a sensation of tightness in the throat may be observed. Once the allergen reaches the stomach, it is broken down by the acid, and the allergic reaction does not progress further. The natural course of the disease is that it usually persists.

If an affected person swallows the raw food, and the allergen is not destroyed by the stomach acids, it is likely that there will be a reaction from histamine release later in the gastrointestinal tract. Vomiting, diarrhea, severe indigestion, or cramps may occur. Rarely, OAS may be severe and present as wheezing, vomiting, hives, low blood pressure, or anaphylaxis.

== Development, causes ==
A person with an allergic disposition sensitized to allergenic pollen proteins through the respiratory route can develop an allergy to heat labile food proteins (for example profilins) in certain fruits and vegetables, which cross-react with pollen proteins.

OAS produces symptoms when an affected person eats certain fruits, vegetables, and nuts. Some individuals may only show allergy to one particular food, and others may show an allergic response to many foods.

Individuals with an allergy to tree pollen may develop OAS to a variety of foods. While the tree pollen allergy has been worked out, the grass pollen is not well understood. Furthermore, some individuals have severe reactions to certain fruits and vegetables that do not fall into any particular allergy category. When tropical foods initiate OAS, allergy to latex may be the underlying cause.

Because the allergenic proteins associated with OAS are usually destroyed by cooking, most reactions are caused by eating raw foods. The main exceptions to this are celery and nuts, which may cause reactions even after being cooked.

=== Cross reactions ===
Allergies to a specific pollen are usually associated with OAS reactions to other certain foods. For instance, an allergy to ragweed is associated with OAS reactions to banana, watermelon, cantaloupe, honeydew, zucchini, kiwifruit, and cucumber. This does not mean that everyone with an allergy to ragweed will experience adverse effects from all or even any of these foods. Reactions may be associated with one type of food, with new reactions to other foods developing later. However, reaction to one or more foods in any given category does not necessarily mean a person is allergic to all foods in that group.

- Alder pollen: almond, apple, celery, cherry, hazelnut, peach, pear, parsley, raspberry, strawberry
- Birch pollen: apple, cherry, carrot, celery, chicory, coriander, fennel, fig, hazelnut, kiwifruit, nectarine, parsley, parsnip, peach, pear, pepper, plum/prune, potato, soy, strawberry, wheat, jackfruit, almond, snow pea, mung bean sprout, radish; Potential: walnut
- Grass pollen: fig, melon, tomato, orange, celery, peach
- Mugwort pollen: carrot, celery, mustard
- Ragweed pollen: artichoke, banana, melon (honeydew, watermelon, cantaloupe), cucumber, dandelion, echinacea, green pepper, honey, kiwifruit, paprika, sunflower seed/oil, zucchini

== Diagnosis ==
The person typically already has a history of atopy and an atopic family history. Eczema, otolaryngeal symptoms of hay fever or asthma will often dominate leading to the food allergy being unsuspected. Often well-cooked, canned, pasteurized, or frozen food offenders cause little to no reaction due to denaturation of the cross-reacting proteins, causing delay and confusion in diagnosis as the symptoms are elicited only to the raw or fully ripened fresh foods. Correct diagnosis of the allergen types involved is critical. Those with OAS may be allergic to more than just pollen. Oral reactions to food are often mistakenly self-diagnosed by patients as caused by pesticides or other contaminants. Other reactions to food—such as lactose intolerance and intolerances which result from a patient being unable to metabolize naturally occurring chemicals (e.g., salicylates and proteins) in food—need to be distinguished from the systemic symptoms of OAS.

=== Testing ===
Many people are unaware that they have OAS. However, if swelling, tingling or pain develops while eating certain foods, it is wise to see an allergy specialist. Before a diagnosis can be made, it is best to keep a food diary. This is important as the physician can then perform an allergy test. A comprehensive history is obtained so that random testing is avoided. The diagnosis of OAS may involve skin prick tests, blood tests, elimination diets, or oral challenges.

=== Exams ===
To confirm OAS, the suspected food is consumed in a normal way. The period of observation after ingestion and symptoms are recorded. If other factors such as combined foods are required, this is also replicated in the test. For example, if the individual always develops symptoms after eating followed by exercise, then this is replicated in the laboratory.

== Treatment ==
OAS must be managed in conjunction with the patient's other allergies, primarily the allergy to pollen. The symptom severity may wax and wane with the pollen levels. Published pollen counts and seasonal charts are useful but may be ineffective in cases of high wind or unusual weather, as pollen can travel hundreds of kilometers from other areas. In addition, patients are advised to avoid the triggering foods, particularly nuts. Peeling or cooking the foods has been shown to eliminate the effects of some allergens such as mal d 1 (apple), but not others such as celery or strawberry. For some foods such as nuts, which have more than one allergen, cooking may eliminate one allergen but not the other.

Antihistamines may also relieve the symptoms of the allergy by blocking the immune pathway. Persons with a history of severe anaphylactic reaction may carry an injectable emergency dose of epinephrine (such as an EpiPen). Oral steroids may also be helpful. Allergy immunotherapy has been reported to improve or cure OAS in some patients. Immunotherapy with extracts containing birch pollen may benefit those with apple or hazelnut related to birch pollen-allergens. Even so, the increase in the amount of apple/hazelnut tolerated was small (from 12.6 to 32.6 g apple), and as a result, a patient's management of OAS would be limited.

== See also ==
- Eczema
- Immunodiagnostics
- List of allergens
- Hay fever
- Toxin
- Food intolerance, non-allergic food hypersensitivity
- Eosinophilic esophagitis
