= Nail polish =

Lacquer applied to fingernails and/or toenails

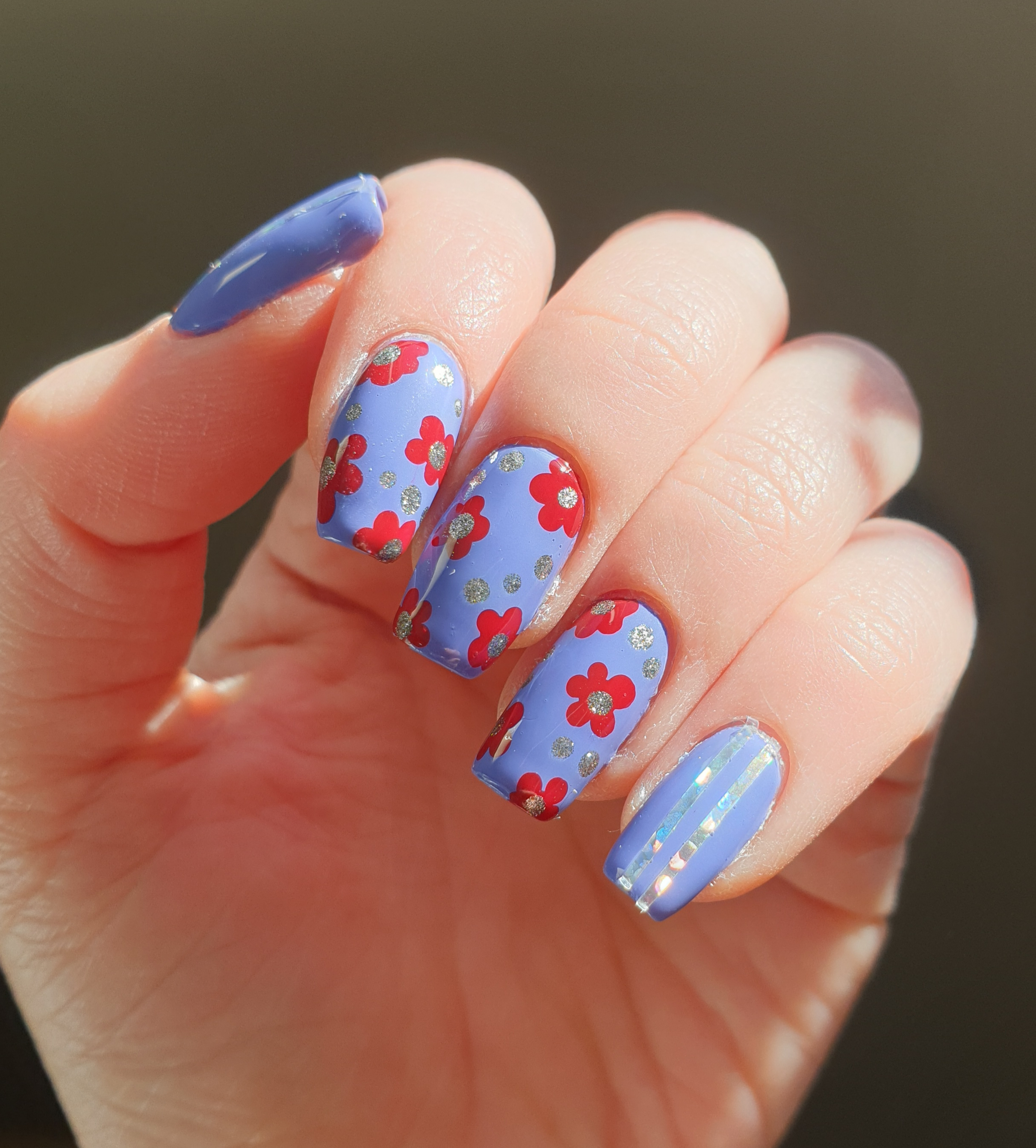
Polished nails with nail art

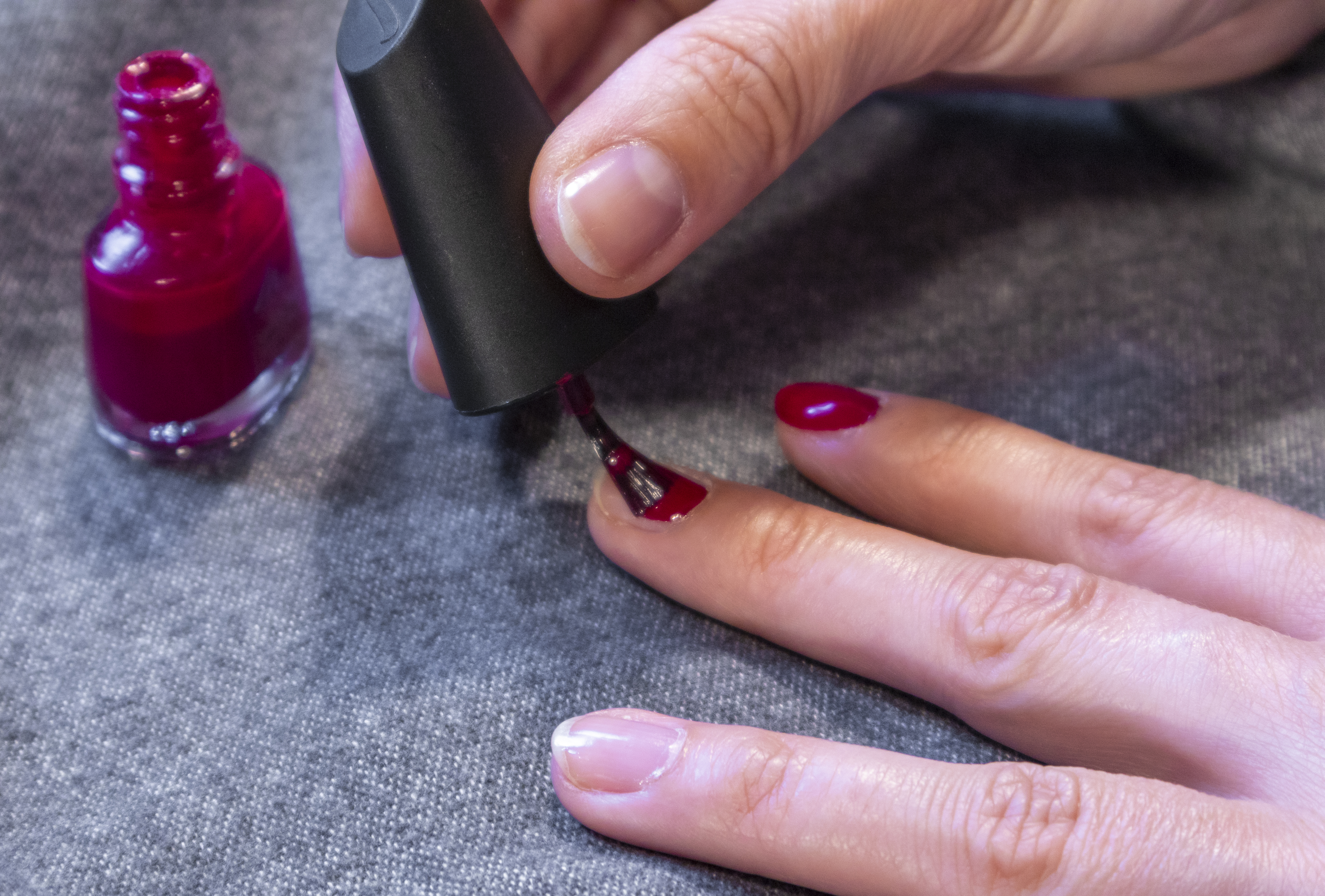
Fingernails before, during, and after application of red nail polish

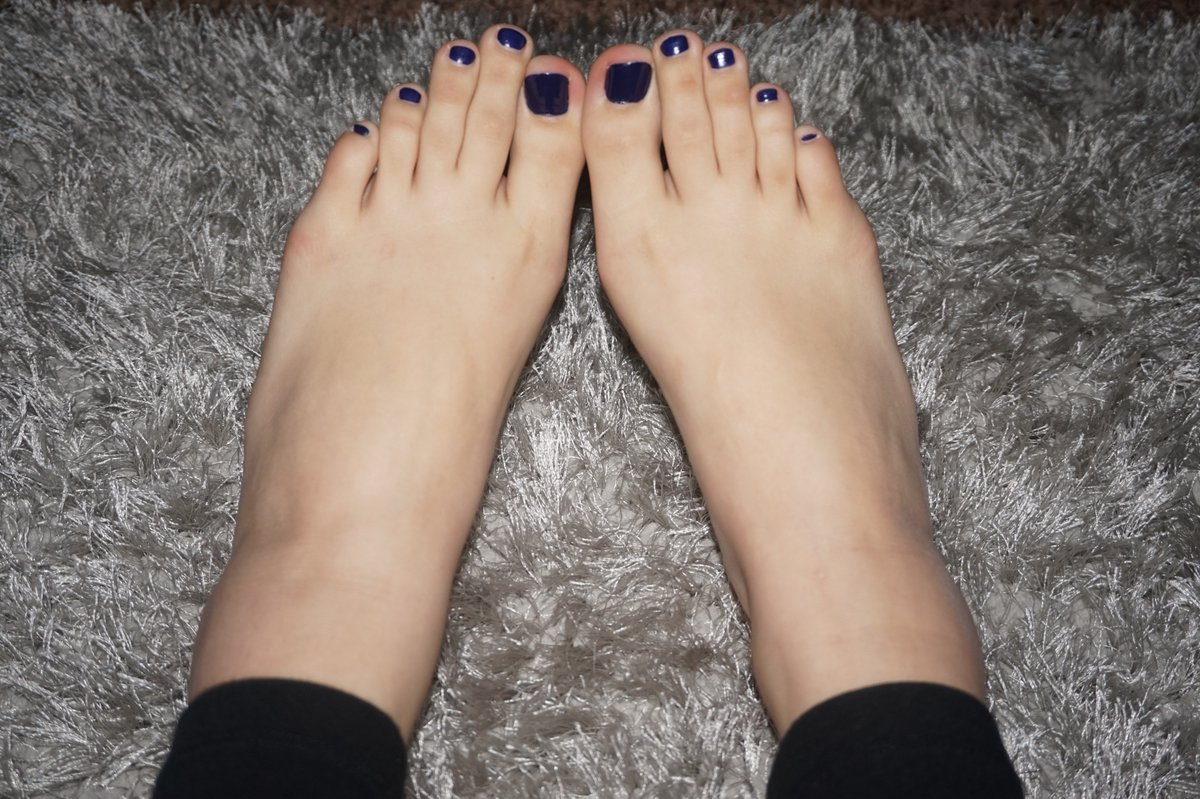
A woman's toes with dark nail polish

Nail polish (also known as nail varnish in British English or nail enamel) is a lacquer that can be applied to the human fingernails or toenails to decorate and protect the nail plates. The formula has been revised repeatedly to enhance its decorative properties, to be safer for the consumer to use, and to suppress cracking or peeling. Nail polish consists of a mix of an organic polymer and several other components that give it colors and textures. Nail polishes come in all color shades and play a significant part in manicures and pedicures.

== History ==
Nail polish has different origins dating back to 3000 BCE in different regions of the world. The modern nail polish concept was much influenced from painting with paint on the fingernails as well as the ongoing collective dynamic evolution process. Nail polish has origins in China and dates back to 3000 BCE. Around 600 BCE, during the Zhou dynasty, the royal house preferred the colors gold and silver. However, red and black eventually replaced these metallic colors as royal favorites. During the Ming dynasty, nail polish was often made from a mixture that included beeswax, egg whites, gelatin, vegetable dyes, and gum arabic.

In Egypt, the lower classes painted their nails a reddish brown with henna. Mummified pharaohs also had their nails painted with henna.

In Europe, Frederick S. N. Douglas, while traveling in Greece in 1810–1812, noticed that the Greek women used to paint their nails "dingy pink", which he understood as an ancient custom.

It was more common to polish nails with tinted powders and creams, finishing off by buffing the nail until left shiny. One type of polishing product sold around this time was Graf's Hyglo nail polish paste.

In Victorian era culture it was generally considered improper for women to adorn themselves with either makeup or nail coloring, since natural appearances were considered more chaste and pure. In the 1920s, however, women began to wear color in new makeups and nail products, partly in rebellion to such prim customs of their recent past. In 1920s France, a big pioneer of nail polish was the hairstylist Antoine de Paris, whose cosmetic company produced some of the first modern polishes, and he shocked the newspapers by painting each of his own nails a different color.

Since the 1920s, nail colors progressed from French manicures and standard reds to various palettes of color choices, usually coordinated with the fashion industry's clothing colors for the season. By the 1940s the whole nail was painted; before that, it was fashionable to leave the tips and a half-moon on the nail bed bare.

== Ingredients ==
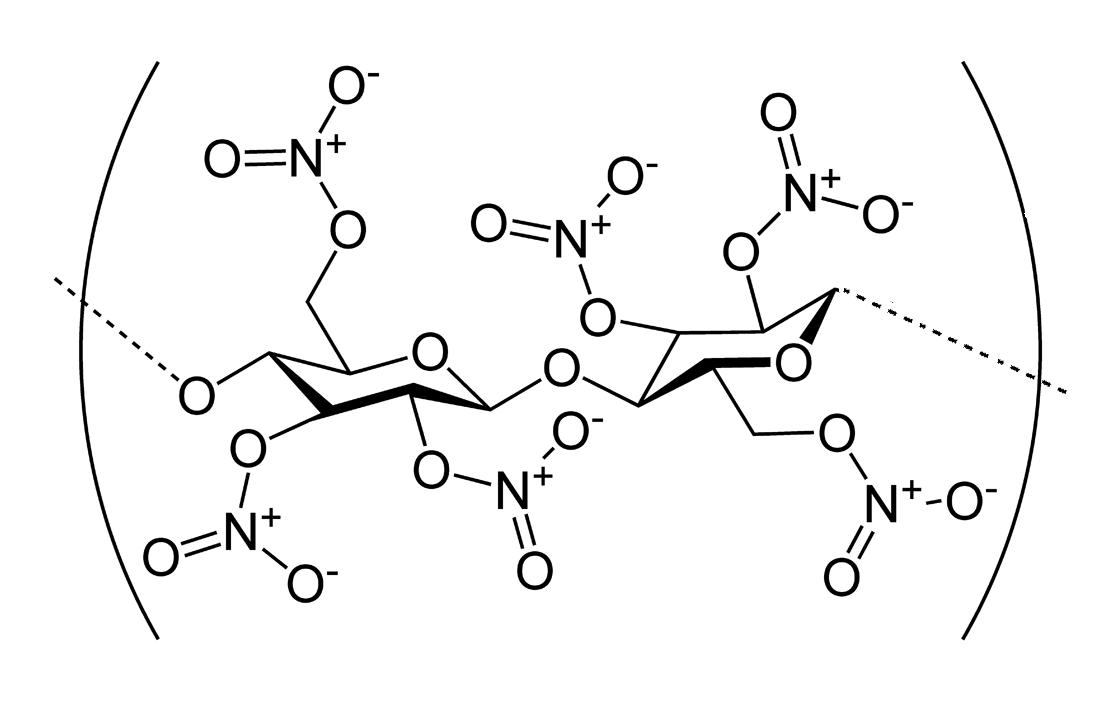
Nitrocellulose is a film-forming polymer that is the main ingredient in most nail polishes.

Modern nail polish consists predominately of a film-forming polymer dissolved in a volatile organic solvent. The most common polymer is nitrocellulose, although the more expensive cellulose acetates such as CAB are claimed to give better performance. In gel nail varnish, the polymer is usually some sort of acrylate copolymer. The solvents are commonly butyl acetate or ethyl acetate. Low levels of various additives are included to give the desired finish:

- Plasticizers to yield non-brittle films. diethylphthalate, dibutylphthalate and camphor are typical.
- Dyes and pigments. Representative compounds include chromium oxide greens, chromium hydroxide, ferric ferrocyanide, stannic oxide, titanium dioxide, iron oxide, carmine, ultramarine, and manganese violet.
- Opalescent pigments. The glittery/shimmer look in the color can be conferred by mica, bismuth oxychloride, natural pearls, and aluminum powder.
- Adhesive polymers ensure that the nitrocellulose adheres to the nail's surface. One modifier used is tosylamide/formaldehyde resin.
- Thickening agents are added to maintain the sparkling particles in suspension while in the bottle. A typical thickener is stearalkonium hectorite. Thickening agents exhibit thixotropy, their solutions are viscous when still but free-flowing when agitated. This duality is convenient for easily applying the freshly shaken mixture to give a film that quickly rigidifies.
- Ultraviolet stabilizers resist color changes when the dry film is exposed to sunlight. A typical stabilizer is benzophenone-1.

== Types ==
=== Base coat ===
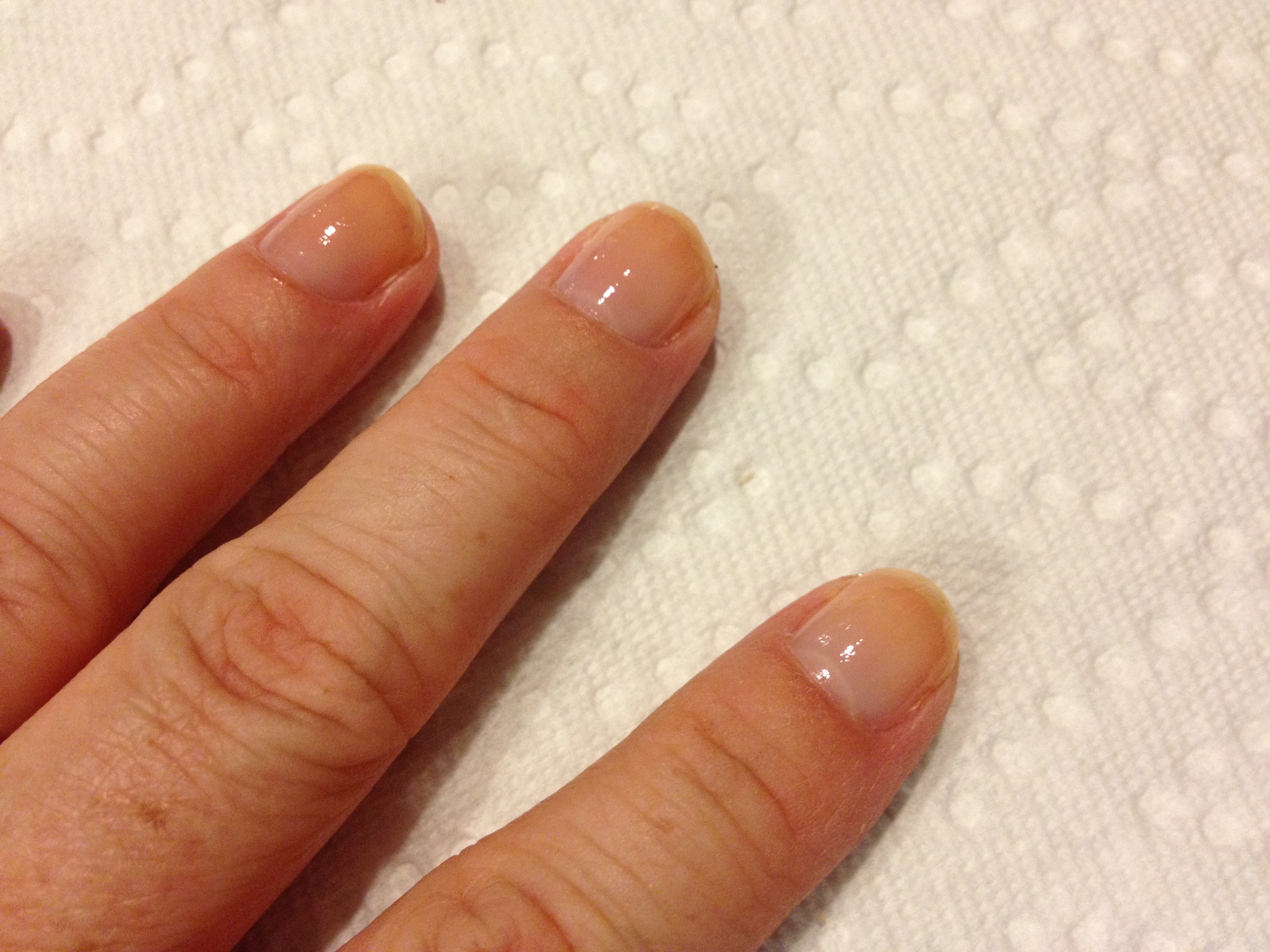
The base coat is clear and is used to strengthen nails.

This type of nail polish is a clear, milky-colored, or opaque pink polish formula that is used specifically before applying nail polish to the nail. Its function is to strengthen nails, restore moisture to the nail, and help polish adhere to the nail. It prevents staining and extends the lifespan of the manicure. Some base coats are marketed as "ridge fillers", and can create a smooth surface, de-emphasizing the ridges that can appear on unbuffed nails. Some base coats, called "peel off base coats", allow the user to peel off their nail polish without using a remover.

=== Top coat ===
This type of nail polish is a clear colored polish formula that is used specifically after applying nail polish to the nail. It forms a hardened barrier for the nail that can prevent chipping, scratching and peeling. Many topcoats are marketed as "quick-drying." Topcoats can help the underlying colored polish dry quickly as well. It gives the polish a more finished and desired look and may help to keep the polish on longer and keep the nails looking fresh.

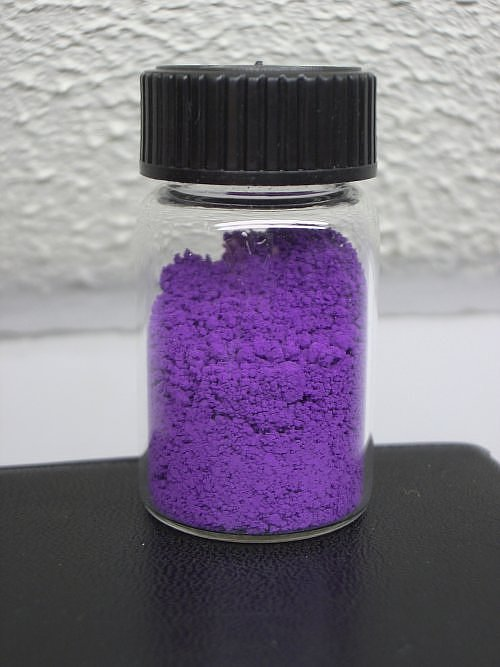
Manganese violet is a typical pigment in nail polish.

=== Gel ===
Gel nail polish has become increasingly popular in recent years due to its long-lasting wear and glossy-smooth-like appearance. These characteristics are due to the type of methacrylate polymer derived from monomers like 2-hydroxyethyl methacrylate (HEMA), 2-hydroxyethyl acrylate (HEA), ethyleneglycol dimethyacrylate (EGDMA), methyl methacrylate (MMA), ethyl methylacrylate (EMA). However, concerns of acute contact dermatitis and respiratory toxicity for MMA and HEMA has led to this compound being banned across Europe or restriction for professional-use only in parts of the US. As such, EMA is more commonly used for gel manicures. Yet, (meth)acrylates materials are utilized in other field like for medical and dental purposes of surgical glue, contact lenses, dentures, bone cement and more, suggesting that a safe chemical manufacturing and application of gel-polish is attainable.

The chemical process of formulation and curing occurs via a free radical polymerization. A photointiatior or catalyst, such as the light sensitive compound benzoyl peroxide, forms a terminal carbon radical upon irradiation of light from a Norrish Type I or II mechanism. Migration of the radical across the carbon chain can lead to a mid-chain radical and thus chain propagation from cross-linking occurs. This branched polymer matrix creates the harden and durable mechanical property of gel nails. It is the trace amount of unreacted methacrylate monomer that result in the adverse health dermatitis reactions. As such, the photoiniator's absorption band spectrum and light source directly influence of the radical generation and degree cross-linking effectiveness. Gel nail polish is painted on the nail similar to traditional nail polish, but does not dry. Instead it is cured under an ultraviolet lamp or ultraviolet LED. These lamps emit shorter wavelength and produce a high energy output to cure and cross-link the monomer powder into polymer.

While regular nail polish formulas typically last two to seven days without chipping, gel polish can last as long as two weeks with proper application and home care. Gel polish can be more difficult to remove than regular nail polish. It is usually removed by soaking the nails in pure acetone (the solvent used in most nail polish removers) for five to fifteen minutes, depending on the formula.

== In fashion ==
Traditionally, nail polish started in clear, white, red, pink, purple, and black. Nail polish can be found in a diverse variety of colors and shades. Beyond solid colors, nail polish has also developed an array of other designs, such as crackled, glitter, flake, speckled, iridescent, and holographic. Rhinestones or other decorative art are also often applied to nail polish. Some polish is advertised to induce nail growth, make nails stronger, prevent nails from breaking, cracking, or splitting, or to stop nail biting.

=== French manicure ===
French manicures are designed to resemble natural nails, and are characterized by natural pink or nude base nails with white tips. French manicures were one of the first popular and well-known color schemes. French manicures may have originated in the eighteenth-century in Paris but were most popular in the 1920s and 1930s. However, the traditional French manicures were much different from what we know today. They were generally red, while leaving a round crescent shape at the area near the cuticle blank to enhance the lunula of the nail, known now as a half-moon manicure.

With the modern French manicure, trends involving painting different colors for the tips of the nails instead of the white. French tip nails can be made with stickers and stencils. It is still typically done by hand through painting with polish or gel, or sculptured with acrylic.

=== Nail art ===
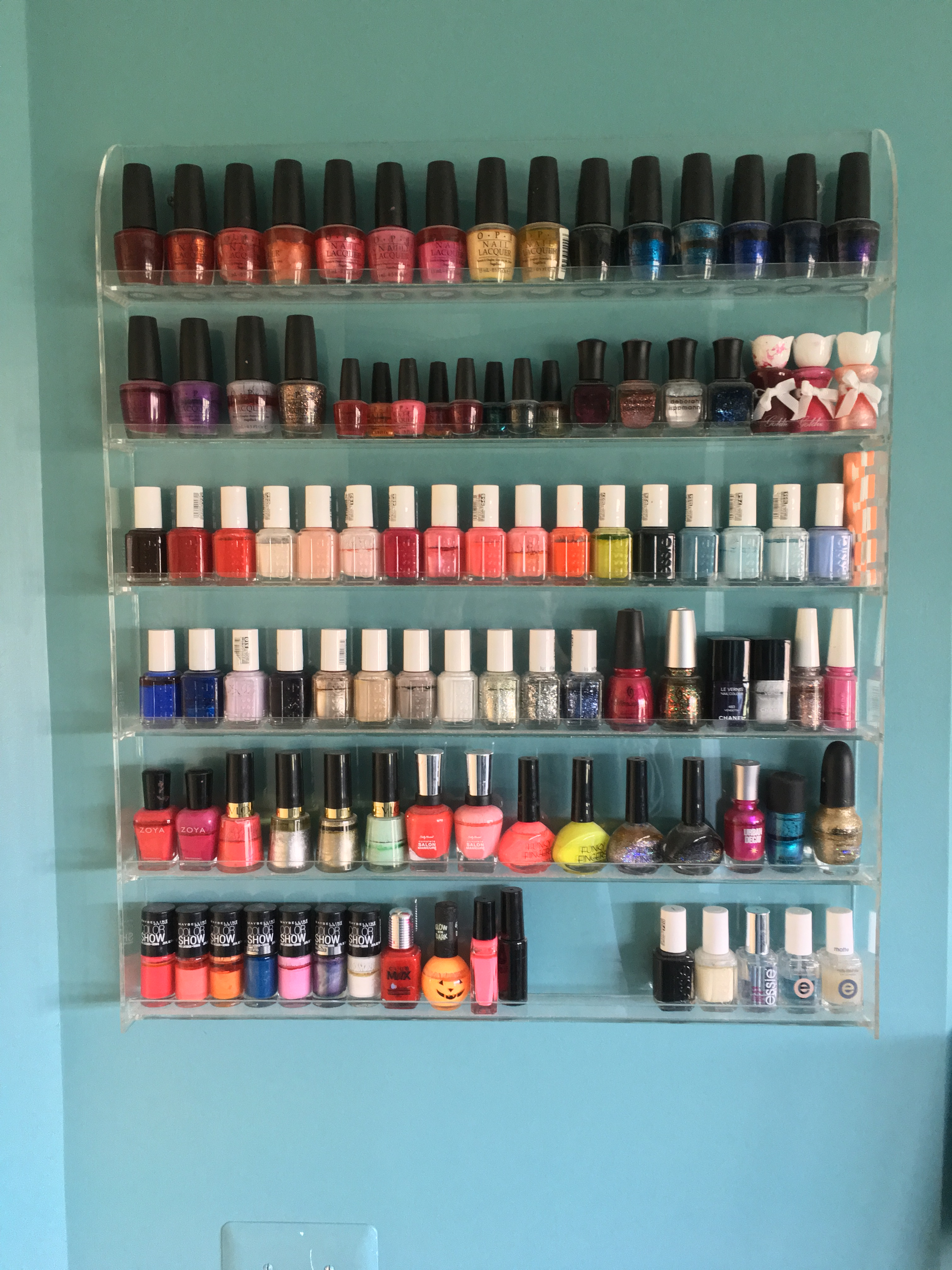
A nail polish collection

Nail art is a creative way to paint, decorate, enhance, and embellish nails. Social media has expanded to a nail art culture by allowing users to share pictures of their nail art. Women's Wear Daily reports nail polish sales hit a record US$768 million in the United States in 2012, a 32% gain over 2011. Several new polishes and related products came on to the market in the 2020s as part of the explosion of nail art, such as nail stickers (either made of nail polish or plastic), stencils, magnetic nail polish, nail pens, glitter and sequin topcoats, nail caviar (micro beads), nail polish marketed for men, scented nail polish, and color changing nail polish (some which change hue when exposed to sunshine, and ranges which change hue in response to heat).

=== Western world ===
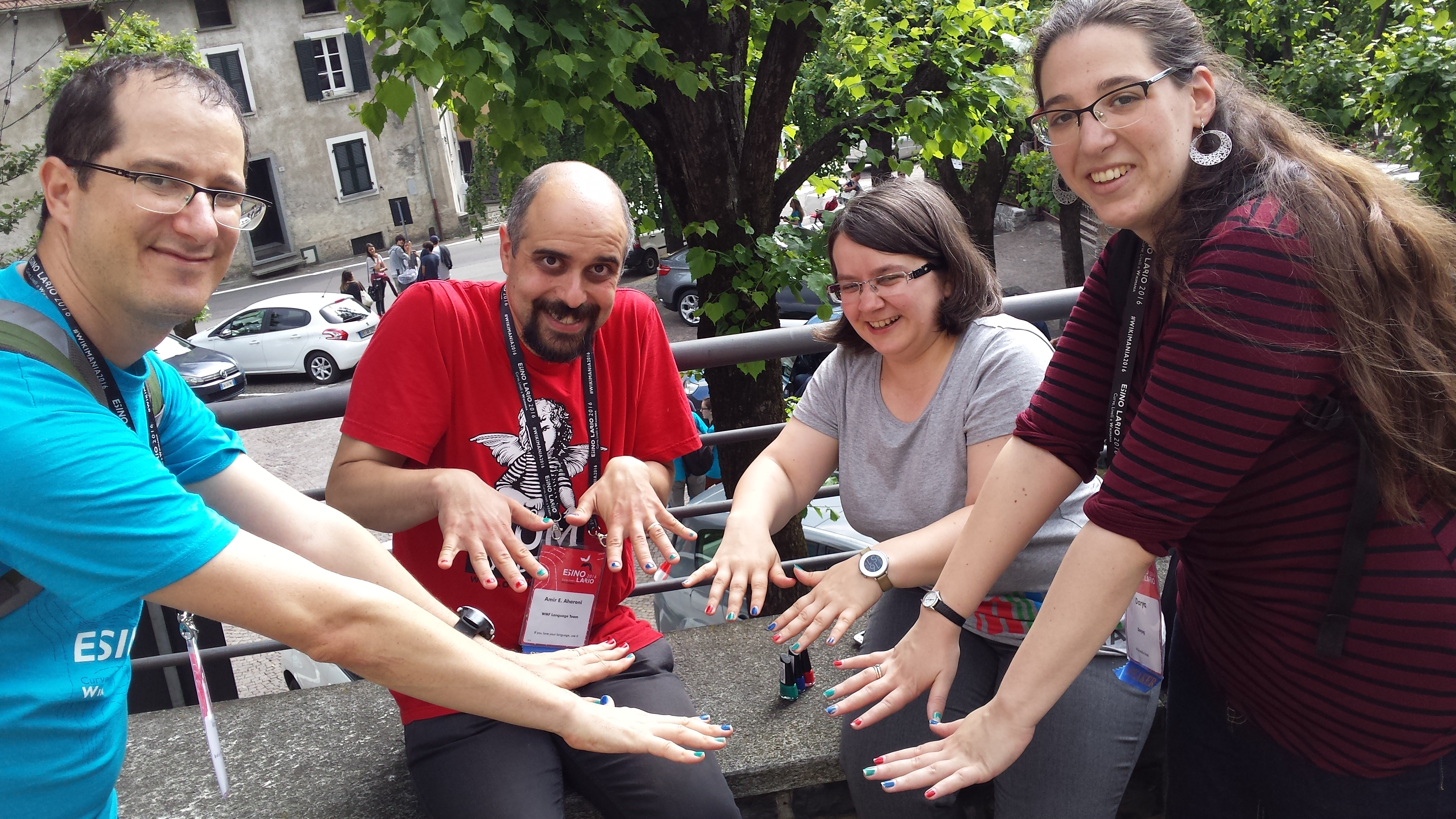
Men and women with painted nails at Wikimania, 2016

Nail polish in the Western world was more frequently worn by women, going in and out of acceptability depending upon moral customs of the day. It is less common for men to wear nail polish, and can be seen as a divergence from traditional gender norms. Colored and clear polishes can be used to protect nails from breakage, impart a well-groomed sheen, or express oneself artistically. Professional baseball players, especially catchers, may wear nail polish on the field.

== Nail polish remover ==
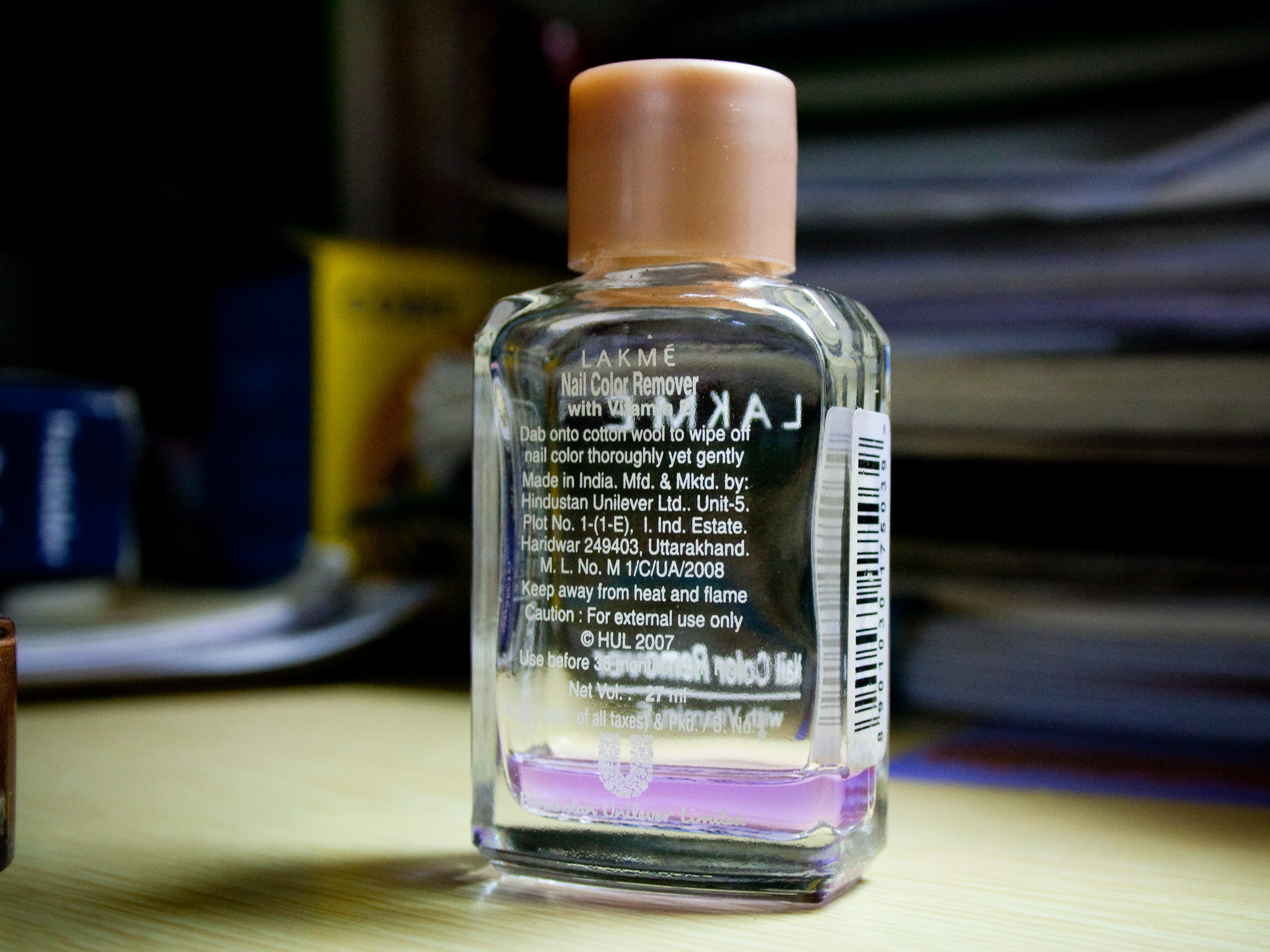
Nail polish remover

Nail polish remover is an organic solvent that may also include oils, scents, and coloring. Nail polish remover packages may include individual felt pads soaked in remover, a bottle of liquid remover used with a cotton ball or cotton pad, or a foam-filled container into which one inserts a finger and twists it until the polish comes off. The choice of remover type depends on the user's preference, and often the price or quality of the remover.

The most common remover is acetone. Acetone can also remove artificial nails made of acrylic or cured gel.

An alternative nail polish remover is ethyl acetate, which often also contains isopropyl alcohol. Ethyl acetate is usually the original solvent for nail polish itself.

Acetonitrile has been used as a nail polish remover, but it is more toxic than the aforementioned options. It has been banned in the European Economic Area for use in cosmetics since 17 March 2000.

== Health concerns ==
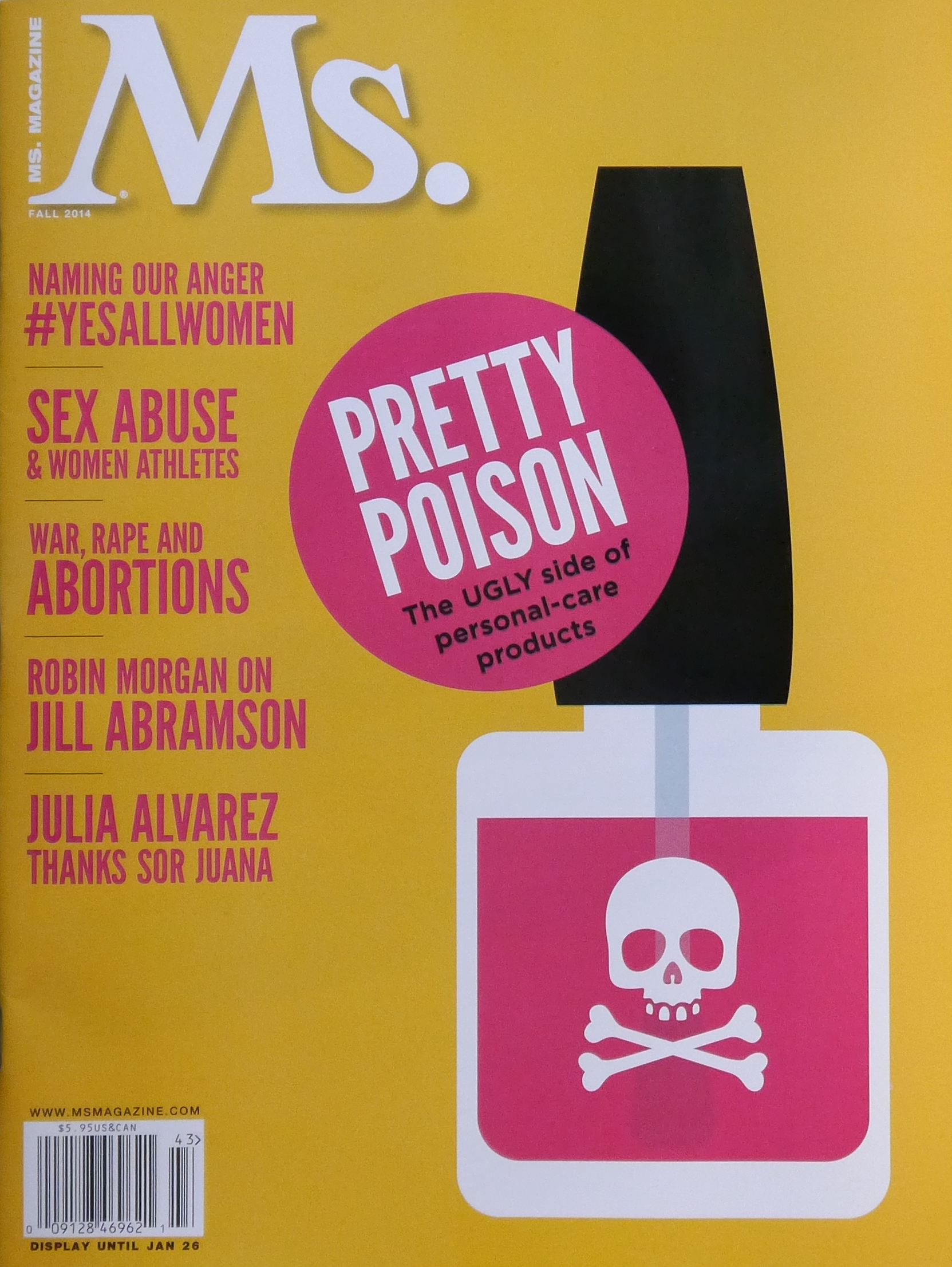
The safety of nail polish was examined in the fall 2014 issue of Ms. magazine.

The health risks associated with nail polish are disputed. According to the U.S. Department of Health and Human Services, "The amount of chemicals used in animal studies is probably a couple of hundred times higher than what you would be exposed to from using nail polish every week or so. So the chances of any individual phthalate producing such harm [in humans] is very slim." A more serious health risk is faced by professional nail technicians, who perform manicures over a workstation, known as a nail table, on which the client's hands rest – directly below the technician's breathing zone. In 2009, Susan Reutman, an epidemiologist with the U.S. National Institute for Occupational Safety and Health's Division of Applied Research and Technology, announced a federal effort to evaluate the effectiveness of downdraft vented nail tables (VNTs) in removing potential nail polish chemical and dust exposures from the technician's work area. These ventilation systems have potential to reduce worker exposure to chemicals by at least 50%. Many nail technicians will often wear masks to cover their mouth and nose from inhaling any of the harsh dust or chemicals from the nail products.

According to Reutman, a growing body of scientific literature suggests that some inhaled and absorbed organic solvents found in nail salons such as glycol ethers and carbon disulfide may have adverse effects on reproductive health. These effects may including birth defects, low birth weight, miscarriage, and preterm birth.

Nail polish formulations may include ingredients that are toxic or affect other health problems. One controversial family of ingredient are phthalates, which are implicated as endocrine disruptors and linked to problems in the endocrine system and increased risk of diabetes. Manufacturers have been pressured by consumer groups to reduce or to eliminate potentially-toxic ingredients, and in September 2006, several companies agreed to phase out dibutyl phthalates. There are no universal consumer safety standards for nail polish, however, and while formaldehyde has been eliminated from some nail polish brands, others still use it.

=== Regulation and environmental concerns ===
The U.S. city of San Francisco enacted a city ordinance, publicly identifying establishments that use nail polishes free of the "toxic trio" of dibutyl phthalate, toluene, and formaldehyde.

Nail polish is considered a hazardous waste by some regulatory bodies such as the Los Angeles Department of Public Works. Many countries have strict restrictions on sending nail polish by mail. The "toxic trio" are currently being phased out, but there are still components of nail polish that could cause environmental concern. Leaking out of the bottle into the soil could cause contamination in ground water.
