= Tosylamide/formaldehyde resin =

Names
- Systematic IUPAC name poly[4-methylbenzenesulfonamide-alt-methanal]
- Other names: Toluenesulfonamide/formaldehyde resin; Formaldehyde-p-toluenesulfonamide copolymer; Santolite MHP; Santolite MS

Identifiers
CAS Number	25035-71-6
ECHA InfoCard	100.132.132
EC Number	607-493-7
PubChem CID	159985
UNII	J6FJV9VTR6
CompTox Dashboard (EPA)	DTXSID80933988

Properties
Chemical formula	(C_{8}H_{9}NO_{2}S)_{n} (n ≤ 10)
Molar mass	Variable (400–1900 g·mol^{−1})
Melting point	82 °C (180 °F; 355 K)
- Except where otherwise noted, data are given for materials in their standard state (at 25 °C [77 °F], 100 kPa). Infobox references

Tosylamide/formaldehyde resin (TSFR) is a polymeric resin used as a plasticizer and secondary film-forming agent in nail polishes. While it was still in use as of 2023, its use has been diminishing in favor of hypoallergenic alternatives, due to the prevalence of reactions causing allergic contact dermatitis of the eyelids, face, and neck.

== Production ==
TSFR is produced by condensing p-tosylamide (often impure, containing o-tosylamide) with formaldehyde. It consists of a mixture of short oligomers with repeating unit −N(Ts)CH_{2}−, terminated by −NHTs or −N(Ts)CH_{2}OH groups.

== Allergenicity ==
Nail polishes containing TSFR were first introduced in 1939, becoming a major cause of allergic contact dermatitis of the eyelids, face, and neck. Allergic responses are caused by the water-soluble contaminants 5-tosyl-1,3,5-dioxazinane (TsN(−)(CH_{2}OCH_{2}OCH_{2}−)) and 3,5-ditosyl-1,3,5-oxadiazinane (TsN(−)(CH_{2}N(Ts)CH_{2}OCH_{2}−)), rather than formaldehyde, which is only present in trace quantities (<0.5%).

Since the early 2010s, the prevalence of allergic reactions to TSFR has decreased, due to the widespread use of hypoallergenic alternatives such as tosylamide/epoxy resin (first introduced in the late 1980s), cellulose acetate butyrate, and polyester resins (e.g. 2,2,4-Trimethyl-1,3-pentanediol–isophthalic acid–trimellitic anhydride).
