= Anusol =

Brand of hemorrhoid medications

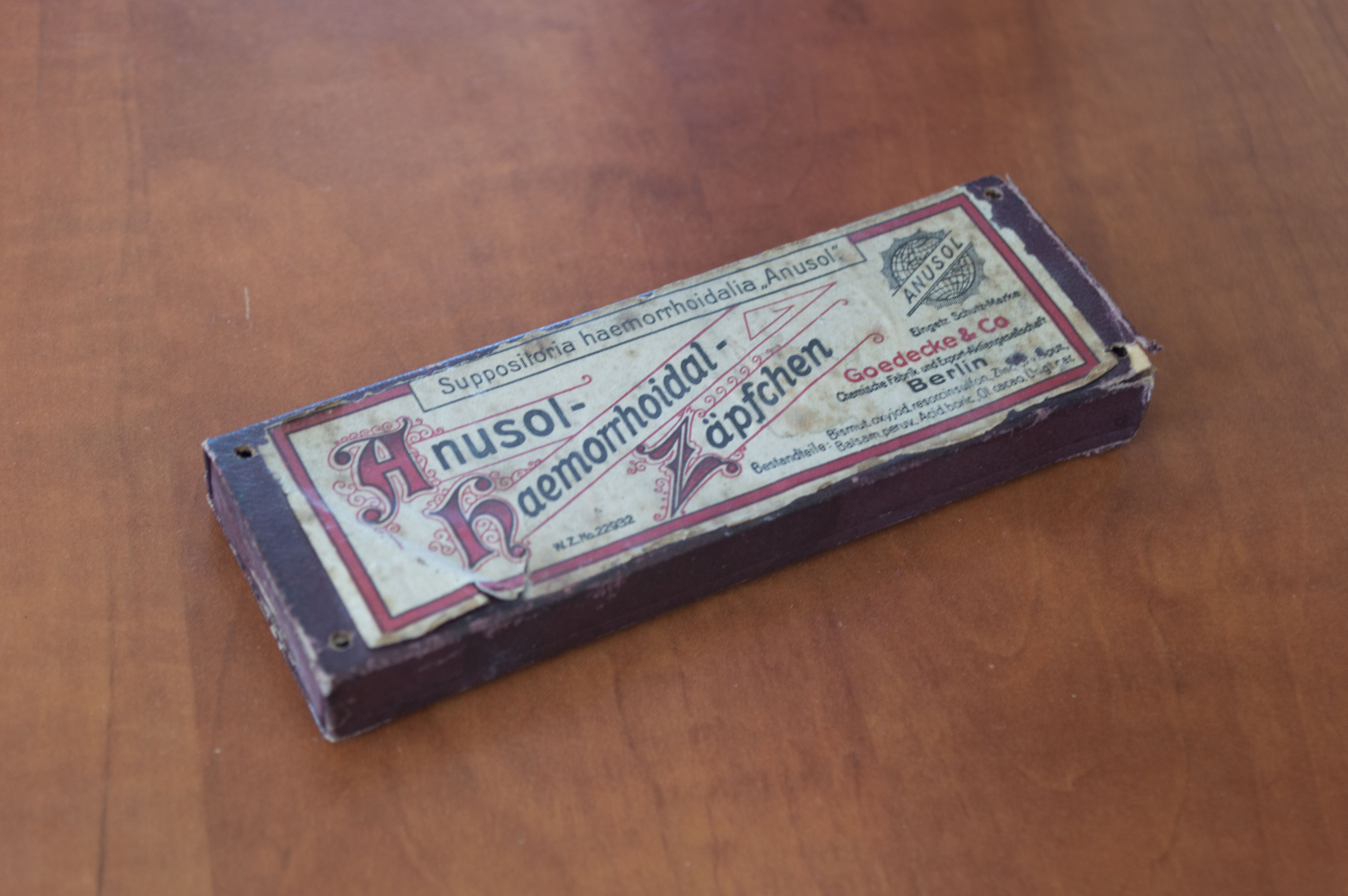
Historical packaging of Anusol suppositories

Anusol (also AnuSol) is a brand of medications that can be used to treat hemorrhoids. The Anusol range includes creams, ointments, and suppositories. Anusol is now known under the brand name Tucks in the United States and some other areas, while being marketed under the Anusol name in other markets. The active ingredients and usage remains unchanged between these brand names.

It is prescription-only in some jurisdictions, but available over the counter in the United States, Canada, and the UK.

== Active ingredients ==
The active ingredient in Anusol ointment and suppositories is zinc sulfate monohydrate which helps decrease the irritation in the area and acts as an astringent. The active ingredient in Anusol plus is zinc sulfate monohydrate and pramoxine HCL, which is antipruritic (also found in Gold Bond). Current products have zinc sulfate monohydrate replaced by zinc oxide instead.

== Allergies ==
Balsam of Peru is an ingredient in Anusol. People who are allergic to Balsam of Peru may experience itching and contact dermatitis in the perianal region, possibly due to unabsorbed substances in the feces.
