= Aquadynia =

- Specialty: Dermatology

Aquadynia is a variant of aquagenic pruritus, and is characterized by a widespread burning pain that lasts 15 to 45 minutes after water exposure.

It is hypothesized that aquagenic pruritus, aquadynia (with or without rash or plaques), and aquagenic urticaria represent a disease continuum since β-Blockers have shown promising effects in preventing aquagenic pruritus, but they may also have a role in preventing aquagenic urticaria and aquadynia.

== See also ==
- Aquagenic pruritus
- Pruritus
- Skin lesion
