= Aquagenic pruritus =

- Other names: Water allergy (Note: Also used to describe aquagenic urticaria)
- Specialty: Dermatology
- Symptoms: Intense itching upon contact with water
- Duration: 10-120 minutes per episode
- Types: Aquadynia
- Diagnostic method: Ruling out other causes
- Differential diagnosis: Aquagenic urticaria, polycythemia vera
- Treatment: Medication, phototherapy, hot water exposure
- Medication: Beta-alanine, topical anti-itch treatment, antihistamines

Aquagenic pruritus is a skin condition characterized by the development of severe, intense, prickling-like epidermal itching without observable skin lesions and evoked by contact with water.

== Presentation ==
Presentation varies from person to person. Some people have discrete attacks, which can last between 10 and 120 minutes while others are symptomatic almost constantly due to atmospheric humidity levels and/or sweating. Itching most frequently occurs on the legs, arms, chest, back, and abdomen, though it can also occur elsewhere.

Itching on contact with water that also includes hives is known as aquagenic urticaria.

== Pathogenesis ==
The exact mechanism of the condition is unknown. Some studies have suggested the itching occurs in response to increased fibrinolytic activity in the skin, inappropriate activation of the sympathetic nervous system, increased activity of acetylcholinesterase, or an increase in mast cell degranulation that releases histamine and other chemicals into the body.

== Diagnosis ==
No definitive medical test is known for aquagenic pruritus. Rather, diagnosis is made by excluding all other possible causes of the patient's itching, including polycythemia vera. Since pruritus is a symptom of many serious diseases, it is important to rule out other causes before making a final diagnosis.

== Treatment ==
Beta-alanine, a nonessential amino acid and freely available as a nutritional supplement in many countries, has been found to suppress or significantly reduce the symptoms in many cases. Anecdotal evidence indicates that it is commonly consumed in doses of 750 mg to 2 grams before water contact. A study found that a dose of 2 grams twice per day led to a "dramatic and sustained improvement" of symptoms in a 13-year-old male patient, allowing him to comfortably shower, exercise, and swim.

Other treatment is usually focused on topical itch management. This can be effected by the application of hot water at the end of a bath or shower, antipruritic lotions or creams such as lotion containing capsaicin, using phototherapy, or the application of hot or cold packs to the skin after water contact. Paradoxically, hot baths or showers help many patients, possibly because heat causes mast cells in the skin to release their supply of histamine and to remain depleted for up to 24 hours afterward.

H1 and H2 blockers, such as loratadine, doxepin, or cimetidine, have historically been the first line of pharmacological treatment, but not all people find relief with these medications. When antihistamines do work, loratadine seems to be the most effective for mild cases and doxepin most effective for more severe cases.

Naltrexone, hydrocortisone, or propranolol may relieve itching for some people.

Sertraline or other selective serotonin reuptake inhibitors (SSRIs) is also a line of treatment. Gabapentin is very helpful.

== Etymology ==
The name is derived from Latin: aquagenic, meaning water-induced, and pruritus, meaning itch.

== See also ==
- Aquadynia
- Aquagenic urticaria
- List of cutaneous conditions
- List of allergies
