= Aquagenic urticaria =

Development of hives after contact with water

- Other names: water itch, water allergy
- Specialty: Dermatology
- Symptoms: Hives after skin contact with water
- Usual onset: Immediate
- Duration: 30 to 60 minutes
- Causes: Unclear (triggered by water)
- Diagnostic method: Based on symptoms, confirmed by "water challenge" test
- Treatment: Medications, phototherapy, barrier cream
- Medication: Antihistamines, propranolol, steroids

Aquagenic urticaria, also known as water allergy and water urticaria, is a form of physical urticaria in which hives develop on the skin after contact with water, regardless of its temperature. The condition typically results from contact with water of any type, temperature or additive.

== Signs and symptoms ==
The main symptom of aquagenic urticaria is the development of physical hives, which may or may not itch. Itching after contact with water, without the development of physical hives, is known as aquagenic pruritus. Aquadynia is a condition in which pain occurs after contact with water.

In severe cases, drinking water can result in swelling of the oral cavity, swelling of the throat, and in extreme cases, anaphylaxis.

The hives associated with aquagenic urticaria are typically small (approximately 1–3 mm), red- or skin-colored welts (called wheals) with clearly defined edges. It most commonly develops on the neck, upper trunk and arms, although it can occur anywhere on the body. Once the water source is removed, the rash generally fades within 30 to 60 minutes.

Water in all forms, such as tap or sea water, swimming pool water, sweat, tears, and saliva can induce the lesions.

== Cause ==
The cause of aquagenic urticaria is not fully understood; however, several mechanisms have been proposed. Interaction between water and a component in or on the skin or sebum has been suggested. This theory suggests that a substance is formed by this interaction, the absorption of which causes perifollicular mast cell degranulation with release of histamine. Another proposed theory is of a water-soluble allergen in the epithelial tissues. Water dissolves the allergen, causing it to diffuse into the tissues, causing histamine release from sensitized mast cells.

== Diagnosis ==
Diagnosis of aquagenic urticaria begins with a clinical history and water challenge test. The water challenge test consists of application of a 35 °C water compress to the upper body for 30 minutes. Water of any temperature can provoke aquagenic urticaria; however, keeping the compress at a similar temperature to that of the human body (37 °C) avoids confusion with cold urticaria or cholinergic urticaria. In addition, a forearm or hand can be immersed in water of varying temperatures to determine whether temperature is a factor in the patient's condition. Aquagenic urticaria differs from aquagenic pruritus, in which contact with water evokes intense itching without visible hives or rash.

Once known as a separate, rare disease, aquagenic urticaria is now considered a subtype of general urticaria. The first case was reported by Walter B Shelley et al. in 1964. The condition is more common in women than men, and typically presents for the first time during puberty. Genetics may play a part, and the condition may be related to other sensitivities such as lactose intolerance.

== Prevention ==
Desensitization does not seem to work for aquagenic urticaria; a patient will continue to react to water no matter how gradually or frequently it is introduced. Topical application of antihistamines like 1% diphenhydramine before water exposure is reported to reduce the hives. Oil in water emulsion creams, or petrolatum, applied as barrier agents prior to a shower or bath may control symptoms.

== Treatment ==
Given the rarity of the disease, clinical efficacy data of treatments is limited. However, current recommendations suggest a trial of a second generation antihistamine up to four-times the standard dosing scheme for initial pharmacology. For patients who cannot be controlled on high dose antihistamines, other therapeutics, including biologics like omalizumab, have shown improvements in case reports. Beta-blocker therapy may also offer a rapid-acting, well-tolerated, and effective treatment option for patients.

== See also ==
- Aquagenic pruritus
- Aquadynia
- Cholinergic urticaria
- Solar urticaria
- List of cutaneous conditions
